= Geng Yan =

Eastern Han dynasty general and marquess (AD 3–58)

- 耿弇 (Gěng Yǎn)
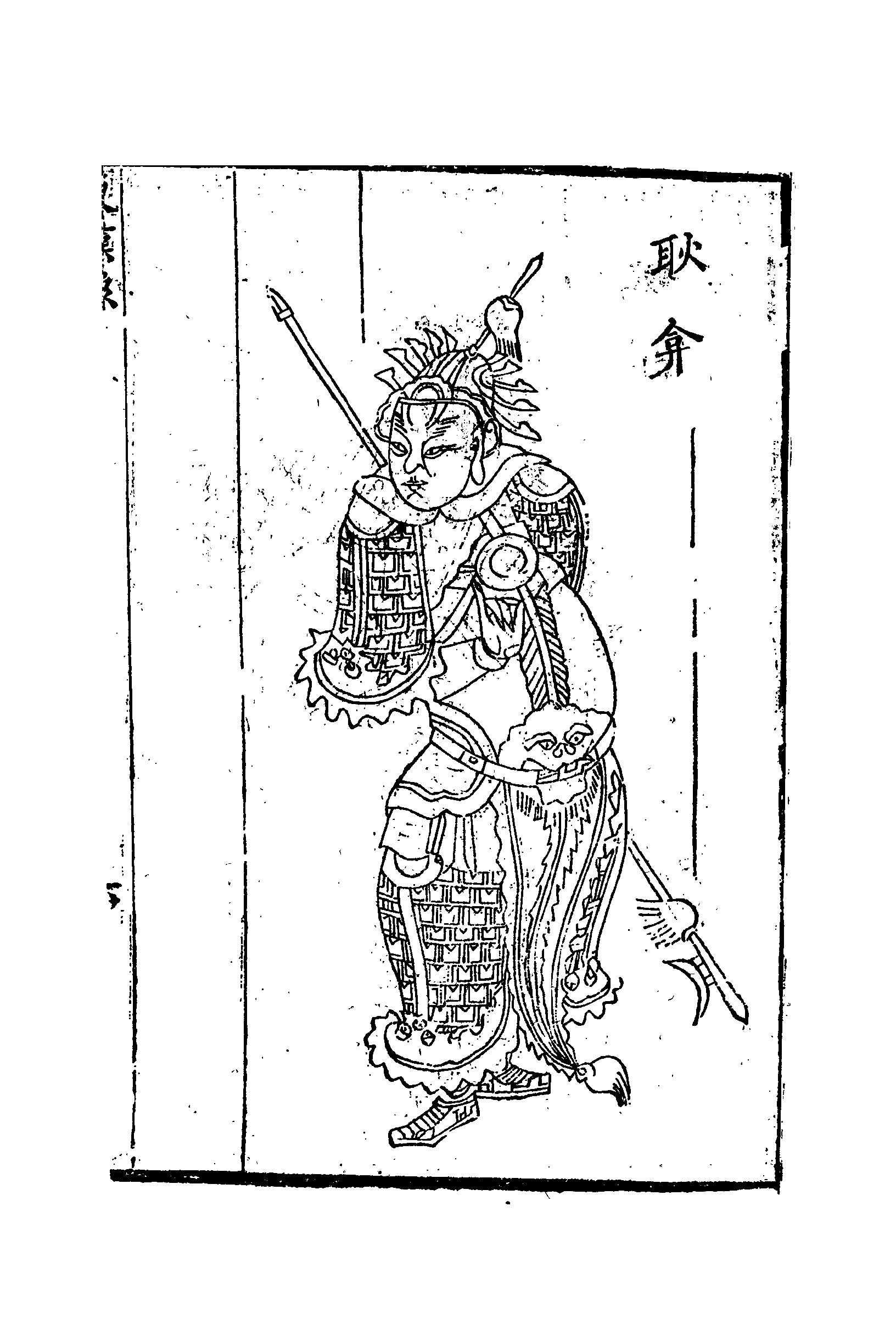
- Born: 3 AD; Maoling, Fufeng Commandery
- Died: 58 AD
- Burial place: Southeast corner of Wanghucheng, Gucheng Township, Shouguang County
- Other name: Bo Zhao
- Occupations: General, military strategist
- Years active: Western Han → Xin dynasty → Eastern Han
- Office: Gatekeeper Attendant → Lieutenant General → General → Grand General of Jianwei; Marquess of Haozhi; Posthumorous title: Marquess Min
- Children: Geng Zhong, Marquess of Haozhi
- Father: Geng Kuang, Marquess Lie of Yumi
- Relatives: Siblings: Geng Shu, Marquess of Muping; Geng Guo; Geng Guang; Geng Ju; Geng Ba, Marquess of Yumi

Geng Yan (Chinese: 耿弇; pinyin: Gěng Yǎn; Wade–Giles: Keng Yen; 3–58 AD) was a Chinese general of the Eastern Han dynasty. Courtesy name Bo Zhao, he was a native of Maoling, Fufeng Commandery He was the son of Geng Kuang (耿況), who was the governor of Shanggu Commandery (上谷, roughly modern Zhangjiakou, Hebei). He initially served Emperor Guangwu of Han as clerk; later, he was a renowned general and military strategist of the Eastern Han dynasty.

Geng Yan persuaded his father, Geng Kuang, to support Liu Xiu, assisting him in securing elite cavalry from Shanggu and Yuyang. Fighting across various regions, he was appointed as a Grand General by Emperor Guangwu at the age of 22. Later, he was tasked with leading an eastern campaign, employing strategies such as besieging cities, feigning attacks, and conserving strength to defeat Zhang Bu, ultimately pacifying the Qi region. Geng Yan "conquered 46 commanderies and conquered 300 cities, never suffering a defeat". Emperor Ming honored Throughout his career, Geng among those who had served his father well by painting their portraits on a palace tower (雲台二十八將, 28 Generals of Yuntai); Geng's portrait was placed in the fourth position.

== Biography ==
Geng Yan, studious from a young age, mastered the Confucian classics under his father, Geng Kuang, the Commandant of Shuodiao (equivalent to the Governor of Shanggu Commandery under the Xin dynasty). (Note: This was an official title under the Xin dynasty, equivalent to the Governor of Shanggu Commandery.) Observing the commandery’s military examinations, which involved setting up flags and practicing horseback archery, he developed a passion for military affairs.

In the first year of the Gengshi Emperor (23 AD), after the emperor ascended the throne and Wang Mang was killed, Geng Kuang, uneasy as a Wang Mang-appointed official, sent Geng Yan as an envoy with tribute from Shanggu to Chang'an to pay homage to the Gengshi Emperor, seeking to secure his position. In December, while traveling through Songzi, the warlock Wang Lang proclaimed himself Liu Ziyu, the lost heir of Emperor Cheng of Han, and raised an army in Handan. Geng Yan’s attendants, Sun Cang and Wei Bao, believed Wang Lang was legitimate and urged him to join. Geng Yan, gripping his sword, declared: “Once I reach Chang’an, I will explain the utility of Shanggu and Yuyang’s cavalry. Returning via Taiyuan and Dai Commandery will take mere tens of days. With elite cavalry, we’ll crush this rabble like dry leaves. Your lack of judgment will lead to your clans’ destruction.” Sun Cang and Wei Bao ignored him and defected to Wang Lang.

=== Recruiting Troops in Yan ===
Hearing that the Gengshi Emperor’s Acting Grand Marshal Liu Xiu was in Lunu, Geng Yan rode north to meet him. Liu Xiu appointed him as a Gatekeeper Attendant. Geng Yan seized the opportunity to persuade the Military Protector Zhu Hu to let him recruit troops to attack Handan. Liu Xiu, amused, said: “This young man has grand ambitions!” and frequently met with him, offering encouragement. Geng Yan wrote to his father, praising Liu Xiu’s vision and strategy, urging him to meet Liu Xiu soon. Geng Kuang traveled to Changping and sent his youngest son, Geng Shu, to present horses to Liu Xiu.

In January of the second year of Gengshi (24 AD), Geng Yan followed Liu Xiu north to Ji. Hearing that Wang Lang’s forces were approaching, Liu Xiu planned to retreat south and consulted his officers. Geng Yan said: “With the enemy approaching from the south, we cannot go that way. Peng Chong, the Governor of Yuyang, is your townsman; my father is the Governor of Shanggu. By mustering ten thousand cavalry from these two commanderies, Handan’s forces are no concern.” Liu Xiu’s officers retorted: “The dead are buried facing south; why head north into a trap?” Liu Xiu, pointing at Geng Yan, said: “This is the master of my northern path.”

When Liu Jie, son of Prince Guangyang, rebelled in Ji, causing chaos, Liu Xiu fled south, while Geng Yan escaped north to Changping to join his father. Geng Yan and Geng Kuang issued a proclamation and combined forces. Convincing his father, Geng Yan sent the Merit Officer Kou Xun to ally with Peng Chong, the Governor of Yuyang. Each commandery dispatched 2,000 cavalry and 1,000 infantry. Geng Yan, alongside Shanggu’s Chief Clerk Jing Dan, Merit Officer Kou Xun, and Wu Han leading Yuyang’s forces, attacked Wang Lang’s generals, Nine Ministers, and colonels, killing over 400 and pacifying 22 counties, including Zhuo, Zhongshan, Julu, Qinghe, and Hejian. When their forces reached Guang’a, rumors of Wang Lang’s army caused alarm. Liu Xiu personally led troops to the city walls, sending scouts to investigate. Wu Han clarified: “We are Shanggu’s troops joining Liu.” Liu Xiu’s forces rejoiced. Liu Xiu asked: “Has Geng Yan found his allegiance?” Geng Yan bowed beneath the walls, detailing the troop deployment. Liu Xiu summoned them, laughing: “Handan’s generals boasted of mustering Yuyang and Shanggu troops. I casually responded, ‘I’ll muster them too.’ Who knew these commanderies would truly come for me! Together, we’ll achieve fame.” Geng Yan was appointed Lieutenant General, retaining command of his troops, and followed Liu Xiu to conquer Handan.

Seeing Liu Xiu’s growing prestige, the Gengshi Emperor appointed him King of Xiao, ordering him to disband his army and return to Chang’an with his generals. The emperor sent Miao Zeng as Governor of Youzhou, Wei Shun as Governor of Shanggu, and Cai Chong as Governor of Yuyang. Residing in Handan’s palace, Liu Xiu rested in the Wenming Hall by day. Geng Yan entered, approaching his bedside, and advised: “The Gengshi Emperor’s rule is faltering, with generals seizing power in the capital’s outskirts and nobles acting recklessly. Imperial orders don’t leave the city gates, and governors are arbitrarily replaced. The people cannot adapt, and scholars fear for their safety. Bandits rob wealth and women; those carrying treasures cannot return home alive. The people lament, yearning for Wang Mang’s Xin dynasty. Bands like Tongma and Chimei, numbering tens to hundreds of thousands, roam freely. The Gengshi Emperor cannot subdue them and will soon fail. You rose in Nanyang, defeating a million enemies; now, securing Hebei, you hold this land of abundance. With righteousness, conquer the four directions and issue commands—the realm can be pacified by proclamation. This critical opportunity must not fall to others. The emperor’s envoy urges you to disband; this must not be heeded. Our troops have suffered losses and desertions. I request to return to Youzhou to muster elite troops for your grand plan.” Liu Xiu, delighted, appointed Geng Yan as Grand General, sending him north with Wu Han to recruit Youzhou’s ten commandery troops. Geng Yan returned to Shanggu, arrested and executed Wei Shun and Cai Chong, while Wu Han killed Miao Zeng, enabling them to muster Youzhou’s forces and march south.

=== Strategic and Martial Prowess ===
In autumn and winter, Geng Yan followed Liu Xiu to defeat the Tongma, Gaohu, Chimei, and Qingdu armies. In spring of the first year of Jianwu (25 AD), he pursued Youlai, Daqiang, and Wufan to Yuanshi. In repeated battles, Geng Yan often led elite cavalry as the vanguard, consistently breaking and routing enemies. Liu Xiu fought at Shunshui’s northern bank, but as the enemy fought desperately, his exhausted troops suffered a major defeat. They held Fanyang, regrouping after days, and the enemy retreated. Geng Yan followed Liu Xiu, chasing the enemy to Rongcheng, Xiao Guangyang, and Anci, defeating them in successive battles. Returning to Ji, Geng Yan, alongside Chen Jun, Ma Wu, Jing Dan, Gai Yan, Zhu Hu, Pi Tong, Geng Chun, Liu Zhi, Cen Peng, Zhai Zun, Jian Tan, and Wang Ba, followed Wu Han to pursue rebels to Luodong and Pinggu, engaging and beheading over 13,000, chasing them to Wuzhong and Tuyin in Right Beiping, then to Junmi before returning. The rebels scattered to Liaoxi and Liaodong, where they were nearly annihilated by the Wuhuan and Mo people.

On June 22, 25 AD, Liu Xiu ascended as emperor. Geng Yan was appointed Grand General of Jianwei. At the time, the imperial clan member Liu Mao gathered forces between Jing and Mi, proclaiming himself General厌新, conquering Yingchuan and Runan with over 100,000 men. Geng Yan, with Cavalry General Jing Dan and Crossbow General Chen Jun, attacked them at Aocang, defeating and subduing them. Liu Mao surrendered and was made King of Zhongshan. On July 22, 25 AD, (Note: The Book of the Later Han likely erred, as there was no ''jihai'' day in the seventh month of Jianwu’s first year.) Emperor Guangwu reached Huai, sending Geng Yan and Crossbow General Chen Jun to garrison Wushejin, securing defenses east of Xingyang, while Wu Han led eleven generals to besiege Zhu Wei in Luoyang. On February 22, 26 AD, Emperor Guangwu ennobled his meritorious vassals as marquesses, elevating Geng Yan to Marquess of Haozhi. (Note: His original marquess title is unknown.)

In February of the third year of Jianwu (27 AD), under Grand Marshal Wu Han, Geng Yan and Tiger Fang General Gai Yan defeated the Qingdu rebels at Zhixi. In April, Emperor Guangwu personally campaigned, and Deng Feng surrendered. Though the emperor wished to pardon him, Geng Yan and Cen Peng remonstrated, and Deng Feng was executed. In June, Yan Cen attacked Nanyang from Wuguan, capturing several cities, with Du Hong of Rang leading a following. Geng Yan fought Yan Cen’s forces at Rang, defeating them, beheading over 3,000, capturing over 5,000 soldiers, and seizing 300 seals. Du Hong surrendered, and Yan Cen fled to Dongyang with a few cavalry.

=== Suppressing Rebellions in Hebei ===
On October 25, Geng Yan accompanied Emperor Guangwu to Chunling, offering a plan to recruit Shanggu troops to attack the rebellious Peng Chong in Yuyang and Zhang Feng in Zhuo Commandery, subdue the Fuping and Huosuo rebels, and then march east to defeat Zhang Bu to pacify Qi. The emperor, impressed by his ambition, approved.

In 28 AD, Geng Yan, with General of Subjugation Ji Zun, General of Righteousness Zhu Hu, and Cavalry General Liu Xi, was ordered to attack Zhang Feng in Zhuo Commandery. Ji Zun arrived first, defeating Zhang Feng. Ordered to attack Yuyang, Geng Yan, noting Peng Chong’s comparable merits to his father and lacking siblings in Luoyang, hesitated to advance alone and requested an audience in Luoyang. Emperor Guangwu decreed: “As a general, your family serves the state loyally, defeating enemies wherever you go, with immense merit. What suspicion requires an audience? For now, garrison Zhuo Commandery with Wang Chang, and devise strategies to advance.” Hearing of Geng Yan’s request, Geng Kuang, uneasy, sent Geng Yan’s brother Geng Guo to Luoyang. The emperor treated Geng Guo kindly, appointing him Gentleman of the Yellow Gate and ennobling Geng Kuang as Marquess of Yumi. Geng Shu was also made Marquess of Muping.

In 29 AD, Peng Chong was defeated. Emperor Guangwu sent Grand Master of Splendid Happiness Fan Hong to Shanggu to escort Geng Kuang to the capital, granting him prime lodging and court attendance. Geng Yan and Wang Chang, following Wu Han, defeated the Fuping and Huosuo rebels at Pingyuan, with over 40,000 surrendering, and pursued remnants to Bohai, where over 10,000 surrendered. The emperor then ordered Geng Yan to advance against Zhang Bu.

=== Conquering All of Qi ===
Geng Yan led his army east against Zhang Bu, appointed King of Qi by Liu Yong. Geng Yan organized surrendered troops, appointed officers, and led Taishan Governor Chen Jun and Cavalry Commandant Liu Xin across the Ji River via a Chaoyang bridge. Hearing this, Zhang Bu appointed General Fei Yi as King of Jinan, stationed at Lixia, with troops at Zhua and dozens of camps at Taishan’s Zhongcheng to await Geng Yan.

Geng Yan first attacked Zhua, failing to capture it by noon. He deliberately left a gap in the siege, allowing defenders to flee to Zhongcheng. Zhongcheng’s troops, hearing of Zhua’s defeat, abandoned their camps. Fei Yi sent his brother Fei Gan to hold Juli. Geng Yan threatened Juli, ordering mass tree-felling to feign filling moats. Surrendered soldiers informed him that Fei Yi, hearing of the planned attack, was preparing a rescue. Geng Yan ordered his troops to prepare siege equipment, publicly announcing an attack on Juli in three days, while secretly loosening prisoner oversight to let them escape. The escapees informed Fei Yi, who led 30,000 elite troops to rescue Juli that day. Geng Yan, delighted, told his generals: “I prepared siege equipment to lure Fei Yi. Now he’s here, as I wished.” He stationed 3,000 to hold Juli, leading elite troops uphill to attack Fei Yi from above, killing him in battle and routing his army. Displaying Fei Yi’s head in Juli caused panic, and Fei Gan fled with his forces to Zhang Bu. Geng Yan entered Juli, seized supplies, and attacked unsubdued cities, pacifying over 40 camps and conquering Jinan.

Zhang Bu, based in Ju County, sent his brother Zhang Lan to hold Xi’an, with commandery governors and over 10,000 troops at Linzi, 40 li apart. Geng Yan advanced to Huazhong, between the cities. Noting Xi’an’s small but sturdy defenses and Zhang Lan’s elite troops, contrasted with Linzi’s weaker defenses despite its fame, Geng Yan feigned an attack on Xi’an, ordering a muster in five days. At midnight on the appointed day, he had his generals eat heartily and marched to Linzi by dawn. Protector Xun Liang urged attacking Xi’an first, but Geng Yan argued: “Xi’an, expecting our attack, is on guard day and night. Striking Linzi unexpectedly will cause panic, and we’ll take it in a day. With Linzi fallen, Xi’an is isolated, and Zhang Lan, cut off from Zhang Bu, will flee. Attacking one gains both. Assaulting Xi’an first risks heavy losses under a fortified city. Even if taken, Zhang Lan could regroup in Linzi, probing our weaknesses. Deep in enemy territory without supply lines, we’d falter in ten days without fighting. Your plan is unsuitable.” Geng Yan attacked Linzi, capturing it in half a day. Zhang Lan, terrified, fled to Ju County.

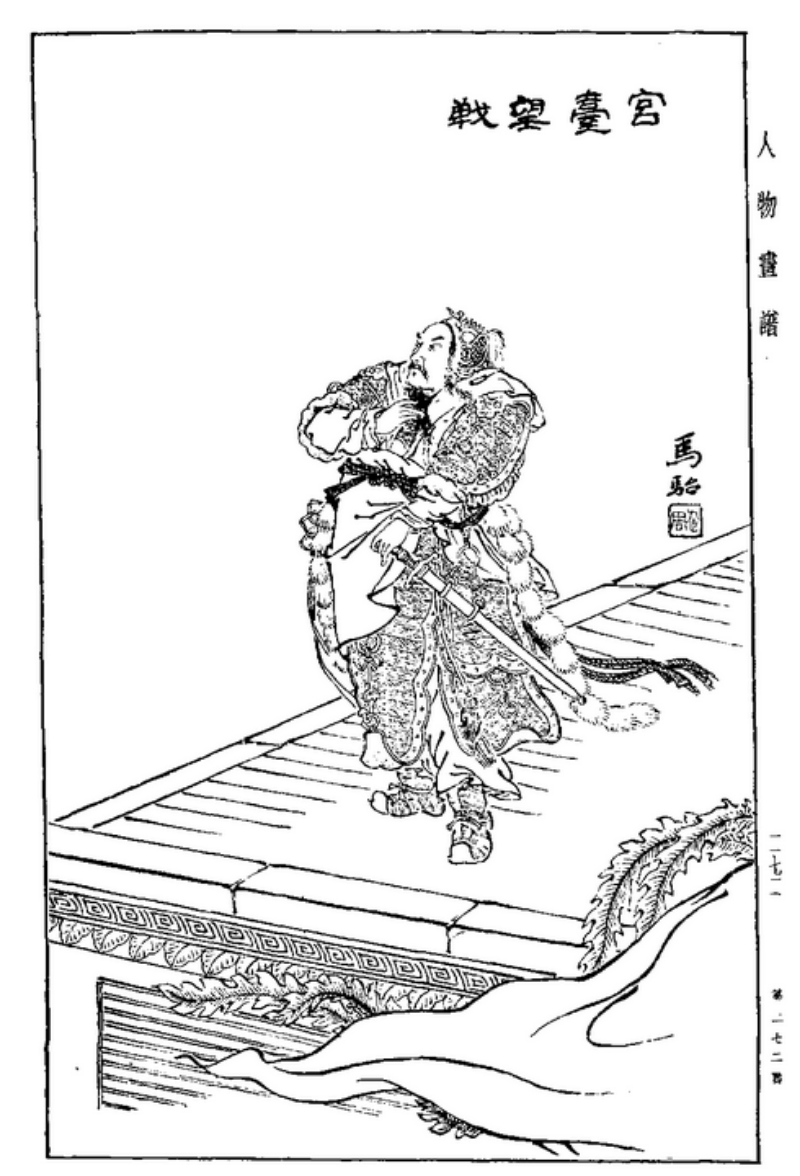
Geng Yan’s Battle at the Palace Terrace.

In winter, October, Geng Yan forbade plundering Ju County until Zhang Bu arrived, to provoke him. Zhang Bu laughed: “I defeated Youlai and Datong’s hundreds of thousands in their camps. Geng Yan’s fewer, weary troops—what’s to fear?” With his brothers Zhang Lan, Zhang Hong, Zhang Shou, and Datong’s former general Chong Yi, Zhang Bu led 200,000 troops to Linzi’s eastern great city to attack Geng Yan. Geng Yan advanced to the Zi River, encountering Chong Yi. His cavalry wanted to charge, but Geng Yan, fearing it would blunt Zhang Bu’s momentum, feigned weakness, retreating to a small city and arraying troops within. Zhang Bu’s spirited forces attacked, clashing with Liu Xin. From a ruined palace terrace, Geng Yan observed, leading elite troops to strike Zhang Bu’s army from the side in East City, routing them. A stray arrow hit Geng Yan’s thigh; he cut it off with a knife, unnoticed by those around him. Fighting continued until nightfall. The next day, Geng Yan led another battle. Hearing of Zhang Bu’s attack, Emperor Guangwu marched to aid, but had not arrived. Chen Jun advised: “Ju County’s enemies are numerous; we should rest and await the emperor.” Geng Yan replied: “With the emperor arriving, a vassal should prepare feasts to welcome the court, not leave rebels for the sovereign.” He fought from morning to night, devastating the enemy, filling ditches with dead. Knowing Zhang Bu’s troops were exhausted and retreating, Geng Yan set ambushes. At midnight, Zhang Bu withdrew, and the ambushes struck, pursuing to Jumei River, with corpses stretching 80–90 li and over 2,000 carts of supplies captured. Zhang Bu returned to Ju, and his brothers dispersed.

Days later, Liu Xiu arrived in Linzi to review the army. Comparing Geng Yan to Han Xin, he said: “Han Xin began his legacy at Lixia; you achieved merit at Zhua, both western Qi’s borders, with comparable feats. Han Xin struck surrendered foes, but you defeated a strong enemy, a harder task. When Tian Heng killed Li Yiji, and later surrendered, Gaozu decreed that Guard Commandant not seek vengeance. Zhang Bu killed Fu Long; if he surrenders, I’ll decree Grand Minister to forgo vengeance, a striking parallel. Your grand plan in Nanyang seemed rash, yet ambition achieves success!”.

Liu Xiu went to Ju, and Geng Yan pursued Zhang Bu, who retreated to Pingshou. Su Mao arrived with over 10,000 troops, rebuking Zhang Bu: “Yan Cen had Nanyang’s elite and fighting skill, yet Geng Yan repelled him. Why attack his camp? You called me but didn’t wait?” Zhang Bu replied: “I’m ashamed, speechless.” Emperor Guangwu sent envoys offering marquess titles to whoever killed the other. Zhang Bu beheaded Su Mao, sending his head to surrender. Zhang Bu, baring his torso and carrying an axe, stood before the army gate. Geng Yan sent him to the emperor via post carriage, entered the city, raised flags for the twelve commanderies, and had Zhang Bu’s troops gather under them. With over 100,000 troops and 7,000 carts, he dismissed them home. Geng Yan marched to Chengyang, subduing the Five Schools’ remnants, fully pacifying Qi, and returned to the capital.

=== Legacy and End ===
In April 30 AD, Geng Yan, with Tiger Fang General Gai Yan, Loyal Han General Wang Chang, Captive-Capturing General Ma Wu, Cavalry General Liu Xin, Martial Might General Liu Shang, and Treason-Punishing General Zhai Zun, was ordered via Longxi to attack Gongsun Shu through the Long Road. Wei Xiao rebelled, and the generals fought him at Longdi, suffering defeat. Geng Yan garrisoned Qi County to guard against Wei Xiao. In spring 32 AD, Laishe seized Lueyang but was besieged by Wei Xiao’s army. In summer, Emperor Guangwu marched to relieve him, with Geng Yan joining, advancing to Shanggui, which refused to surrender. Geng Yan and Gai Yan were ordered to besiege it. In January 33 AD, Wei Xiao died, and his son Wei Chun became king. In August, Geng Yan, with General of the West Feng Yi, Tiger Fang General Gai Yan, General of Martial Prominence Ma Cheng, and Martial Might General Liu Shang, under Lai Xi, entered Tianshui to attack Wei Chun, capturing camps in Anding and Beidi. The next summer, they defeated Gongsun Shu’s generals Tian Yan and Zhao Kuang. In October, Lai Xi, Geng Yan, and Gai Yan broke Luomen, with Wei Chun’s allies Zhou Zong, Xing Xun, Ke Yu, and Zhao Hui surrendering, pacifying Longyou.

In the 13th year of Jianwu (37 AD), with the nation pacified, Geng Yan, aged 35, resigned as Grand General. As a marquess, he attended court, and whenever major events arose, he was summoned to the palace to consult on strategies and tactics. Geng Yan and his brothers Geng Shu, Geng Guo, Geng Guang, Geng Ju, and Geng Ba—six brothers holding high ranks with green and purple sashes—were celebrated as a noble tale of their time.

In the first year of Yongping under Emperor Ming of Han (58 AD), Geng Yan died. His posthumous name was Marquess Min.

== Critics ==
- Liu Xiu: "In the past, Han Xin defeated Lixia to establish his foundation; now the general has attacked Zhujia to rise to prominence. These are both on the western border of Qi, and the merits can be compared. But while Han Xin struck against those who had already surrendered, the general alone defeated strong enemies, so his achievement is harder than Xin's. Also, Tian Heng once executed Li Sheng, but when Tian Heng surrendered, Emperor Gao ordered the Commandant of Guards not to seek vengeance. Zhang Bu also killed Fu Long, yet if Bu came to submit, I would order the Grand Minister over the Masses to forgive his grievance. These cases are much alike. The general had earlier devised this great strategy in Nanyang, and though it seemed difficult and unlikely, in the end the will of one with ambition prevails!"
- Fan Ye, Book of the Later Han: "When Huaiyin discoursed with King Xiang, he assessed the trend of events and foresaw that the temple of Gaozu would prevail. When Geng Yan devised his strategies in Hebei and set plans in Nanyang, he too foresaw that the enterprise of Guangwu would succeed. Yet though Yan himself subdued all of Qi, he received no further reward. Was he not resentful? Perhaps the measure of the times did not allow room. Three generations served as generals, something Daoists say is inauspicious, but the Geng family ended with honor through their achievements. Did they use war to end war? How was it that only they could prosper so?". "Lord Haozhi waged war, skilled in planning and commanding. He recruited troops from Yan and assembled them in the Han camp. He sought audience in Zhao's palace, poured wine in Qi's city. Kuang and Shu followed, and they accomplished success. Guo planned long strategies, dividing the fierce barbarians. Bing harmonized relations with the Xiongnu, Kui broke through their ranks. Earnest Bazong drew forth springs from barren wells."

== Family ==
Marquis of Yumi Lie; Geng Kuang
Marquis of Haozhi Min; Geng Yan	Marquis of Muping; Geng Shu	Geng Guo	Geng Guang	Geng Ju	Marquis of Yumi; Geng Ba
Marquis of Haozhi; Geng Zhong	Marquis of Muping; Geng Xi	Marquis of Meiyang Huan; Geng Bing	Marquis of Suyi; Geng Kui	Geng Gong	Marquis of Yumi; Geng Wenjin
Marquis of Haozhi; Geng Feng	Marquis of Muping Ting; Geng Bao	□	Geng Ji	Marquis of Meiyang; Geng Chong	□	Geng Pu	Marquis of Yumi; Geng Xi
Marquis of Haozhi; Geng Liang	Marquis of Muping; Geng Ji	Marquis of Linlü Ting; Geng Cheng	□	Geng Hong	Geng Ye	Marquis of Yumi; Geng Xian
Marquis of Haozhi; Geng Xie	Geng Ji	Marquis of Yumi; Geng Yuan
□
Geng Hong

=== Origin ===
The Geng clan's ancestors, during the reign of Emperor Wu of Han, moved from Julu to Fufeng Maoling when holding an official position of 2000 bushels (er qian shi).

=== Children ===
- Gong Hong: Inherited the title of Marquis of Haozhi. As Cavalry Commandant, he followed Dou Gu on an expedition, attacking the Xiongnu in the Tianshan. See his article for details.

=== Descendants ===
Geng Yan's younger brother Geng Guo’s great-grandson Geng Ji plotted against Cao Cao and his clan was exterminated; only Geng Hong, grandson of Geng Yuan, survived.

== Related ==
=== Legend ===
- In folklore, the 28 generals of the Cloud Terrace are believed to correspond to the Twenty-Eight Mansions, with Geng Yan corresponding to the "Fang Rabbit" (房日兔).

=== In popular culture ===
- In Singing All Along, Jin Hao portrayed Geng Yan.

== Bibliography ==
- Official histories:
  - Book of the Later Han (in Chinese), Volume 19, "Biography of Geng Yan".
  - Hou Hanshu Ji·Annals of Emperor Guangwu (in Chinese).
  - Zizhi Tongjian, Han annals.
- Other:
  - Gregorian and Chinese calendar conversions referenced from Academia Sinica's 2000 Years of Chinese-Western Calendar Conversion Site .
  - Fan, Ye. "Biography of Emperor Guangwu". Hou Han Shu vol. 1. Archived from the original on 10 February 2008.
