= Wu Han (Han dynasty) =

1st-century CE Eastern Han dynasty general (died 44)

Wu Han 吳漢 子顔 (courtesy name)
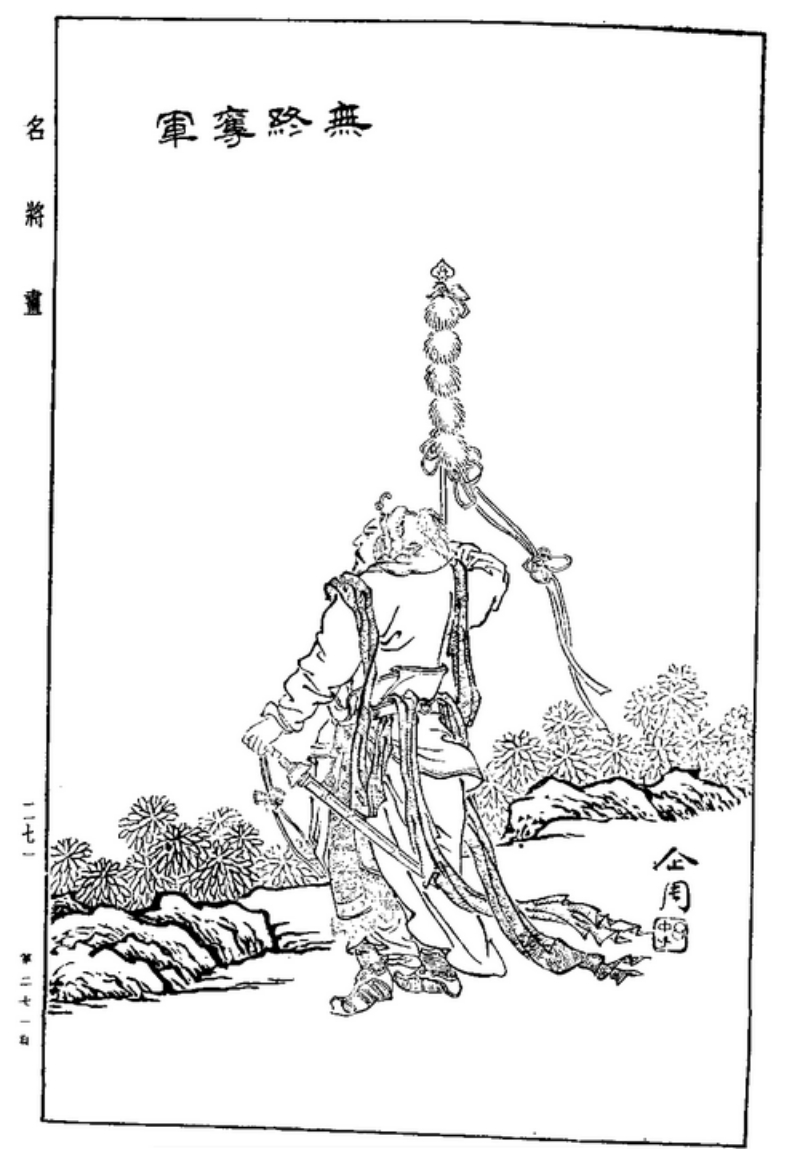
- Born: Unknown; Wan, Nanyang, Henan
- Died: xinhai day of the 5th month of the 20th year of the Jianwu era, Eastern Han (18 June 44 CE)
- Resting place: Wu Laozhuang Village, Longxing Township, Wolong District, Nanyang City, Province of Henan
- Other names: Ziyan (子顔); Marquis Zhong of Guangping (廣平忠侯)
- Occupations: Military general, politician
- Era: Western Han → Xin dynasty → Eastern Han
- Title: Village Chief → Magistrate of Anle → Deputy General → Great General → Grand Marshal; Marquis of Loyalty (posthumous title)
- Children: Wu Cheng, Marquis Aiping of Guangping; Wu Guo, Marquis of Xincai
- Family: Wu Wei; Wu Xi, Marquis Baoqin

Wu Han (1st century BCE — 18 June 44 CE), courtesy name Ziyan, was a Chinese military general and politician during the Eastern Han dynasty who made great contributions to Emperor Guangwu (Liu Xiu)'s reestablishment of the Han dynasty and who is commonly regarded as Emperor Guangwu's best general, but who was also known for cruelty against civilians. He was also one of the 28 generals of Yuntai (Note: ranked no. 2, behind Deng Yu).

Wu Han assisted Emperor Guangwu of Han in summoning troops from Youzhou, defeating various rebel forces such as the Tanxiang bandits and the Yexi mountain thieves. He successively eliminated separatist warlords including Zhu Wei, Liu Yong, Dong Xian, and Gongsun Shu, ultimately contributing to the unification of the empire.

== Biography ==
=== Fleeing to Yuyang ===
In his early years, Wu Han came from a poor family and served as a village chief in his home county (Note: Wan County, Nanyang Commandery, Jingzhou). After a guest committed a crime, he lost his household registration and fled with Peng Chong (彭寵) to Yuyang (漁陽, roughly modern Beijing). At that time, Peng Chong served in the army of Wang Yi, a subordinate of Wang Mang in Luoyang. Hearing that his younger brother had joined the Han forces and fearing punishment, Peng Chong escaped with Wu Han to Yuyang, where their father had once been a governor. There, they made a living trading horses, traveling between Yan and Ji, forging ties with local heroes.

In the first year of Gengshi (23 CE), an envoy of Emperor Gengshi, Han Hong, learned that Peng Chong and Wu Han were fellow townsmen and had received recommendations about Wu Han. Consequently, he appointed Peng Chong as Deputy General and acting Governor of Yuyang, and Wu Han as Magistrate of Anle.

Wu was strong in military tactics but not in overall strategies, and he often became the implementer of Emperor Guangwu's own excellent strategies. Wu was, to his credit, known for his hard work and lack of corruption. He also was a major advocate against pardons – a fact later cited by the great Shu Han statesman Zhuge Liang in refusing to grant pardons.

=== Joining Liu Xiu ===
In the first year of Gengshi (23 CE), Emperor Gengshi dispatched acting Grand Marshal Liu Xiu to pacify Hebei. Meanwhile, Wang Lang falsely claimed to be a descendant of the Liu family and raised an army in Handan. Hearing that Liu Xiu was a respected elder, Wu Han persuaded Peng Chong to align with Liu Xiu. Peng Chong agreed, though his subordinates favored Wang Lang. At that moment, a scholar brought news exposing Wang Lang’s fabricated identity and the counties’ allegiance to Liu Xiu. Wu Han forged a proclamation from Liu Xiu denouncing Wang Lang as a pretender, convincing Peng Chong and his officials of its authenticity.

At the same time, the Governor of Shanggu, Geng Kuang, also sought to join Liu Xiu and sent Kou Xun to ally with Peng Chong. Peng Chong mobilized 3,000 infantry and cavalry, appointing Wu Han as acting Chief Secretary alongside his fellow townsman Gai Yan and Wang Liang to march south, killing Wang Lang’s general Zhao Hong.

After Kou Xun returned, he joined forces with Shanggu Commandery’s general Jing Dan, Kou Xun, and Geng Yan to unite Shanggu’s forces with Yuyang’s. Leading Yuyang and Shanggu’s elite cavalry and infantry south, they defeated Wang Lang’s army, beheading 30,000 enemies and pacifying 22 counties, including Zhuo, Zhongshan, Julu, Qinghe, and Hejian. In the second year of Gengshi (24 CE), their forces merged with Liu Xiu’s at Guang’a, where Liu Xiu appointed Wu Han as Deputy General. After conquering Wang Lang’s Handan, Wu Han was enfeoffed as Marquis of Jianze.

Wu Han was a man of simple character and few words, unable to express himself eloquently. Deng Yu and other generals recognized this but frequently recommended him. Upon being summoned, he earned Liu Xiu’s favor and often remained close to him.

=== Securing Hebei ===
At that time, rebel groups like Tongma, Datong, Gaohu, Chonglian, Tiejing, Daqiang, Youlai, Shangjiang, Qingdu, Wuxiao, Wufan, Wulou, Fuping, and Huosuo—numbering millions—plundered the region. Liu Xiu sought to summon troops from Youzhou to suppress them. Consulting Deng Yu late at night about a suitable commander, Deng Yu praised Wu Han’s bravery and strategic acumen, unmatched among the generals. On Deng Yu’s recommendation, Liu Xiu appointed Wu Han as Great General. Together with the newly appointed Great General Geng Yan, Wu Han was sent north with credentials to mobilize elite cavalry from ten commanderies.

The Youzhou Governor under Emperor Gengshi, Miao Zeng secretly prepared his forces and ordered the commanderies to defy Wu Han’s summons. Wu Han swiftly rode to Wuzhong with twenty cavalrymen, catching Miao Zeng off guard during a welcoming sortie. He ordered his cavalry to behead Miao Zeng, seizing his troops and prompting cities to surrender in awe. Wu Han then mustered regional forces, marched south to rendezvous with Liu Xiu at Qingyang, and submitted the troop roster. Initially, the generals doubted he would share his forces, but after he handed over the roster, they requested troops from him. Liu Xiu sarcastically rebuked them, leaving them ashamed.

Dissatisfied with Emperor Gengshi’s Secretariat Director Xie Gong, Liu Xiu seized an opportunity while Xie was away fighting rebels. He ordered Wu Han and Cen Peng to assault Ye city. Wu Han sent a rhetorician to persuade the Wei Commandery Governor Chen Kang, left in charge, to surrender. Chen Kang arrested Xie Gong’s wife, children, and Great General Liu Qing. Returning defeated from Longlü, Xie Gong, unaware of Chen Kang’s defection, entered the city with a few hundred cavalry, only to be captured and personally executed by Wu Han.

In the first year of Jianwu (25 CE), Liu Xiu marched north against the rebel forces. Wu Han often led 5,000 elite cavalry as the vanguard, repeatedly breaching cities first. During a battle north of Shunshui, Liu Xiu pursued the enemy recklessly after a victory but suffered a defeat, his fate briefly unknown. As the generals wavered, Wu Han rallied them, saying, “Everyone fight on! Emperor Xiao’s nephew is in Nanyang—why fear losing a leader?” The army’s panic subsided after days. After the rebels fled to Yuyang, Liu Xiu sent Wu Han with Geng Yan, Chen Jun, Ma Wu, Jing Dan, Gai Yan, Zhu Hu, Pi Tong, Geng Chun, Liu Zhi, Cen Peng, Zhai Zun, Jian Tan, and Wang Ba—twelve generals—to pursue them. At Lu East and Pinggu, they crushed the enemy, chasing them relentlessly between Wuzhong and Tuyin in Youbeiping, returning from Junmi. The remaining rebels scattered into Liaoxi and Liaodong, where they were nearly wiped out by the Wuhuan and Mo peoples.

When Hebei was pacified, Wu Han and the generals presented maps and charts, proclaiming Liu Xiu emperor. On the jisi day of the sixth month (July 22), Guangwu ascended the throne. Intending to appoint General Pingdi Sun Xian as Grand Marshal based on prophecy, he faced dissent. A decree called for nominations, and the ministers recommended only Wu Han and Jing Dan. Guangwu, citing Wu Han’s role in strategy and his elimination of Miao Zeng and Xie Gong, chose him as Grand Marshal, appointing Jing Dan as General of Agile Cavalry. On the day Ren Wu of the seventh month (August 28), Wu Han was officially named Grand Marshal and re-enfeoffed as Marquis of Wuyang. (Note: The title Marquis of Wuyang was also held by Fan Kuai, a famed general who served under Emperor Gaozu of Han, founder of the Western Han.)

Liu was impressed by Wu's prowess on the battlefield, and he made Wu one of his key generals. After Liu declared himself emperor in 25, he made Wu the commander of the armed forces (大司马, da sima) – one of the three most important officials in the imperial government. It is because Emperor Guangwu greatly elevated Wu, who was Peng's deputy, while ignoring Peng in his promotions, that partly led to Peng's eventual revolt against Emperor Guangwu in 26.

=== Subduing Guandong ===
Thereafter, Liu Xiu ordered Wu Han, alongside Great General of Jianyi Zhu You, Court Prosecutor Cen Peng, Right General Wan Xiu, Gold-holding General Jia Fu, Agile Cavalry General Liu Zhi, General of Yanghua Jian Tan, General of Accumulated Archers Hou Jin, and Deputy Generals Feng Yi, Zhai Zun, and Wang Ba—eleven generals—to besiege Zhu Wei in Luoyang for months. On the day Xin Mao of the ninth month (November 5), Zhu Wei, persuaded by Cen Peng, surrendered the city.

In the first month of the second year of Jianwu (26 CE), Wu Han led Grand Minister Wang Liang, Great General of Jianyi Zhu You, Great General Du Mao, Gold-holding General Jia Fu, Yanghua General Jian Tan, Deputy General Wang Ba, Cavalry Commandant Liu Long, Ma Wu, and Yin Shi to decisively defeat the Tanxiang bandits east of Ye at the Zhang River, with over 100,000 surrendering. On the day Geng Chen of the first month (February 22), Guangwu dispatched envoys with sealed edicts to enfeoff meritorious vassals. Wu Han was named Marquis of Guangping, granted the domains of Guangping, Chizhang, Quzhou, and Guangnian—four counties. Scholar Ding Gong argued that Deng Yu (Marquis of Liang) and Wu Han (Marquis of Guangping) holding four counties each defied the principle of strong trunk and weak branches, clashing with legal norms. Guangwu retorted, “I’ve never heard of a vassal ruined by too much land.”

Wu Han then led generals to attack the Yexi mountain bandit Li Boqing and others, reaching Xiuwu in Henei, crushing all their garrisons. Guangwu personally visited to commend them. Ordered to advance on Nanyang, Wu Han captured Wan, Nieyang, Li, Rang, and Xinye, then marched south, defeating Qin Feng at Huangyou River. However, Wu Han’s lax discipline allowed his troops to plunder excessively. Deng Feng, General of Breaking Barbarians, returning home and enraged by Wu Han’s ravaging of Xinye, rebelled, defeated the Han army, seized its supplies, and entrenched at Yuyang, allying with Dong Xin and others. The rebellion was quelled only by the next summer.

Later, Wu Han and Deputy General Feng Yi crushed the Wulou bandits of Changcheng, including Zhang Wen, then triumphed over Tongma and Wufan at Xin’an.

In the third year of Jianwu (27 CE), on the day Jia Chen of the intercalary first month, Wu Han followed Liu Xiu to Yiyang to subdue the Red Eyebrows’ remnants. On the day Bing Wu of the same month, they surrendered, offering the seal and ribbon of Emperor Gao. In the second month, Wu Han led Great General of Jianwei Geng Yan and Great General of Tiger Teeth Gai Yan to defeat and subdue the Qingdu army west of Zhi.

In the fourth month, he commanded General of Agile Cavalry Du Mao, General of Strong Crossbows Chen Jun, and five other generals to besiege Su Mao at Guangle. Liu Yong’s general Zhou Jian rallied over 100,000 men to relieve Guangle. Wu Han led light cavalry to intercept but was defeated, injuring his knee and retreating. Zhou Jian entered the city. The generals urged Wu Han, “The enemy is vast, and you’re injured in bed—our troops will panic.” Rising despite his wounds, Wu Han feasted his men, boosting morale. The next day, Zhou Jian and Su Mao attacked Wu Han’s camp. Wu Han deployed elite units—Huangtou, Wu He, and others—with over 3,000 Wuhuan cavalry. Zhou Jian’s forces collapsed and fled back to the city. Wu Han pursued, stormed the gates, and routed them; Su Mao and Zhou Jian escaped. After the victory, Wu Han left Du Mao and Chen Jun to hold Guangle, leading his troops to assist Gai Yan in besieging Liu Yong at Suiyang. By the seventh month, with Suiyang’s food exhausted, Liu Yong, Su Mao, and Zhou Jian fled to Qian, where Qingwu killed Liu Yong en route. Both cities surrendered.

In the fourth year of Jianwu (28 CE), Wu Han, with Chen Jun and former General Wang Liang, defeated the Wuxiao bandits at Linping, pursued them to Jishan in Dong Commandery, and crushed them. He then attacked Changzhi in Qinghe and Wuli bandits in Pingyuan, pacifying both. At that time, five clans in Ge County expelled their magistrate, seizing the city in rebellion. The generals vied to attack, but Wu Han refused, declaring, “The rebellion in Ge stems from the magistrate’s fault. Anyone advancing rashly will be executed.” He sent a proclamation to the commandery, ordering the magistrate jailed and apologizing to the city. The five clans rejoiced and surrendered. The generals marveled, “Taking a city without fighting—beyond ordinary men.” As Tai Mountain’s heroes allied with Zhang Bu, Wu Han recommended General of Strong Crossbows Chen Jun as Tai Mountain Governor, defeating Zhang Bu’s forces and pacifying the region. In the second month of the fifth year of Jianwu (29 CE), Wu Han, with Great General of Jianwei Geng Yan and General of Han Loyalty Wang Chang, defeated and subdued the Fuping and Huosuo bandits in Pingyuan.

In the third month, General Pingdi Pang Meng rebelled, killed Chu Commandery Governor Sun Meng, and joined Dong Xian in the east. In the sixth month, Qin Feng surrendered to Zhu Hu, but Wu Han accused Zhu Hu of defying orders by accepting it. Liu Xiu executed only Qin Feng, sparing Zhu Hu. Pang Meng, Su Mao, and Jiao Qiang besieged Taocheng. Liu Xiu fought them personally while Wu Han, stationed in Dong Commandery, was summoned, breaking the enemy. That night, Pang Meng, Su Mao, and Jiao Qiang abandoned their baggage and fled. Dong Xian gave Liu Yu tens of thousands of troops to garrison Changlü, while he held Xinyang with elite forces. Wu Han defeated him, forcing a retreat to Changlü. Advancing to besiege, Wu Han terrified Dong Xian, who summoned Wuxiao remnants to Jianyan. Liu Xiu held firm, refusing battle. The Wuxiao ran out of food and scattered. Liu Xiu then besieged Dong Xian, breaking them after three days. In the eighth month, Wu Han pursued them. Jiao Qiang surrendered with his men, Su Mao fled to Zhang Bu, and Dong Xian and Pang Meng escaped to Zeng Mountain, later entering Tan city with subordinates’ aid. Soon, Wu Han captured Tan; Liu Yu’s soldier Gao Hu beheaded Liu Yu to surrender, pacifying Liang. Wu Han then besieged Dong Xian and Pang Meng at Qu. In the spring of the sixth year of Jianwu (30 CE), with the city’s grain exhausted, Dong Xian and Pang Meng slipped out, attacking Gan’yu but were repelled by Langya Governor Chen Jun, fleeing into the marshes. In the second month, Wu Han took Qu. Dong Xian, seeing his family captured, intended surrender but was killed by Wu Han’s lieutenant Han Zhan at Fangyu. Shandong was fully subdued, and Wu Han returned to the capital.

=== Ordered to Conquer Shu ===
In the fifth month, Wei Xiao rebelled, and Wu Han was tasked with guarding Chang’an. That year, Lu Fang rebelled; Wu Han and General of Agile Cavalry Du Mao attacked him repeatedly but failed.

In the eighth year of Jianwu (32 CE), Guangwu personally campaigned against Wei Xiao. Wu Han and Great General of Zhengnan Cen Peng besieged Wei Xiao at Xicheng. Ignoring Guangwu’s advice to disband excess troops, Wu Han pressed the attack, but food shortages led to desertions. In the eleventh month, Cen Peng dammed a valley to flood Xicheng. Before the water rose a zhang, Wei Xiao’s generals Xing Xun and Zhou Zong arrived with Shu’s Gongsun Shu’s reinforcements. Cen Peng covered the rear as Wu Han and others withdrew. In the sixth month of the ninth year of Jianwu (33 CE), Wu Han led Great General of Hengye Wang Chang, Great General of Jianyi Zhu You, General of Subduing Barbarians Wang Ba, and General of Breaking Treachery Hou Jin—four generals with over 50,000 men—to attack Lu Fang’s generals Jia Lan and Min Kan at Gaoliu. The Xiongnu sent cavalry to aid Lu Fang; Wu Han’s wagons bogged down in rain, and the battle faltered, forcing a retreat to Luoyang. In the first month of the tenth year of Jianwu (34 CE), Wu Han, with Wang Ba, Wang Chang, Zhu You, and Hou Jin, led 60,000 troops back to Gaoliu against Jia Lan. The Xiongnu’s Left Southern General sent thousands of cavalry to assist; Wang Ba and others defeated them at Pingcheng. Returning via Yanmen, Wu Han and Du Mao attacked Lu Fang’s general Yin You at Gu and Fanzhi but failed.

In the twelfth month of the eleventh year of Jianwu (35 CE), Wu Han led Great General of Zhengnan Cen Peng with a naval force to conquer Shu’s Gongsun Shu. Cen Peng breached Jingmen, advancing deep into Jiangguan. Wu Han stayed at Yiling, equipping oared ships and leading 30,000 Nanyang troops and conscripts up the river. When Cen Peng was assassinated, Wu Han took full command.

In the first month of the twelfth year of Jianwu (36 CE), Wu Han fought Wei Dang and Gongsun Yong at Yufu Ford, routing them, besieging Wuyang, and annihilating Gongsun Shu’s son-in-law Shi Xing’s 5,000 reinforcements, killing Shi Xing. Entering Jianwei, Wu Han took Guangdu, sent light cavalry to burn Chengdu’s city bridge, and subdued all minor cities east of Wuyang. In the ninth month, ignoring Guangwu’s orders to hold Guangdu and avoid recklessness, Wu Han advanced with 20,000 men to Chengdu, camping north of the river ten li from the city, while deputy General of Wuxi Liu Shang camped south of the river with over 10,000, twenty li apart. Guangwu, alarmed, sent a reprimanding edict, but before it arrived, Wu Han was defeated and besieged by Xie Feng and Yuan Ji. Rallying his men, Wu Han held camp for three days, broke out, and killed Gongsun Shu’s Grand Minister Xie Feng and Gold-holding General Yuan Ji. Retreating to Guangdu, he left Liu Shang to hold the enemy, submitting a self-critical memorial. Later, fighting between Chengdu and Guangdu, he won eight battles. Gongsun Shu consulted Yan Cen, who urged scattering wealth to rally 5,000+ death-sworn troops. Yan Cen feigned a challenge at the market bridge, while Gongsun Shu ambushed Wu Han’s rear. Wu Han fell into the water, escaping by clinging to his horse’s tail. In the eleventh month, with supplies dwindling, Wu Han planned a river retreat but was dissuaded by Zhang Kan. On the day Wu Yin (December 24), General of Aiding Might Zang Gong’s forces reached Xianmen. Yan Cen fought Zang Gong from dawn to dusk, winning three clashes, but his starving troops faltered. Wu Han struck, sending Protectors Gao Wu and Tang Han with tens of thousands of elite troops against Gongsun Shu. Gao Wu stabbed Shu in the chest; Shu fell from his horse, handed his troops to Yan Cen, and died that night. The next morning, Yan Cen surrendered. On the day Xin Si (December 27), Chengdu fell. Zhang Kan entered first, inspected the treasury without taking a thing, and comforted the people. Wu Han’s troops then entered, massacred, looted, burned Gongsun Shu’s palaces, and exterminated Gongsun Shu and Yan Cen’s clans. Enraged, Liu Xiu issued a decree condemning Wu Han.

=== Later years ===
In the first month of the thirteenth year of Jianwu (37 CE), Wu Han led troops down the river to Wan. A decree allowed him to visit his family tomb, granting him 20,000 hu of grain. In the fourth month, he returned to the capital, where Guangwu feasted the troops and rewarded their merits.

In the fifteenth year of Jianwu (39 CE), Wu Han, with General of Raising Might Ma Cheng and General of Capturing Barbarians Ma Wu, marched north against the Xiongnu, relocating over 60,000 people from Yanmen, Dai Commandery, and Shanggu to east of Juyong and Changshan Passes. After pacifying Shu, Wu Han had petitioned to enfeoff the princes, but Guangwu refused. He persisted until the third month, when Guangwu consulted the court and agreed.

In the second month of the eighteenth year of Jianwu (42 CE), Shu Commandery General Shi Xin rebelled in Chengdu, proclaiming himself Grand Marshal. He attacked Governor Zhang Mu, who fled over the walls to Guangdu. Shi Xin issued proclamations to the counties; Yang Wei of Dangqu and Xu Rong of Qutu raised thousands in support. Guangwu, noting Shi Xin’s past as Cen Peng’s protector and military expertise, sent Wu Han with Liu Shang and Grand Palace Grandee Zang Gong, leading over 10,000 men, to suppress him. Wu Han entered Wudu, mustered troops from Guanghan, Ba, and Shu Commanderies, and besieged Chengdu for over a hundred days. In the seventh month, the city fell, and Shi Xin was executed. Wu Han rafted down the river, subdued Ba Commandery, and intimidated Yang Wei and Xu Rong into disbanding. He executed over 200 rebel leaders and relocated hundreds of their allies to Nan Commandery and Changsha before returning.

In the twentieth year of Jianwu (44 CE), Wu Han fell gravely ill. Guangwu visited him, asking his final words. Wu Han replied, “I’m too foolish to know much, but I beg Your Majesty to be cautious with pardons.” On the day Xin Hai of the fifth month (June 18), he died. A decree mourned him, granting the posthumous title Marquis of Loyalty, with his funeral modeled after Great General Huo Guang’s.

== Commentaries ==
A major fault of Wu was that, as noted, he was cruel to civilians, and his soldiers were lacking in discipline with regard to pillaging civilians. In 26, for example, as Wu Han led his forces through Nanyang Commandery (Note: roughly modern Nanyang, Henan), his soldiers often pillaged from the people. At that time, one of Emperor Guangwu's other generals, Deng Feng (鄧奉), who was from Nanyang Commandery, happened to be on vacation in the commandery. He was so incensed by Wu's cruelty that he led the people in revolt. A more salient example of Wu's cruelty, however, came in 36, when the Han forces, commanded by Wu, captured Chengdu, the capital of Gongsun Shu's separatist state Chengjia, to finally reunify the empire. Chengdu surrendered after Gongsun died from battle wounds during the siege of Chengdu. Two days later, Wu suddenly ordered that the Gongsun and Yan (Note: the clan of Gongsun's general Yan Cen (延岑)) clans be slaughtered to the last child, and that his soldiers pillage the city of Chengdu and burn Gongsun's palace. A large number of civilians were raped or killed during the pillage. Other than an edict rebuking Wu and his deputy Liu Shang (劉尚), Emperor Guangwu allowed Wu's actions to go unpunished.

Historical records and later scholars have offered varied perspectives on Wu Han’s career and actions:

- Liu Xiu: “Wu Gong is barely satisfactory, yet he looms like an enemy state.”
- Fan Ye in 《Hou Han Shu》: “From the Jianwu era, Wu Han consistently held the highest office, cherished from start to finish, likely due to his simplicity and strength. Confucius said, ‘Resolute, steadfast, and plainspoken—this is close to benevolence.’ Could this not describe Han? Once, Chen Ping’s cunning bred suspicion, while Zhou Bo’s plain loyalty earned trust. When righteousness fails to unite, the clever are doubted for their excess, and the simple trusted for their lack.”
- Zhu Xi: “Famed ancient generals who achieved renown were all cautious and meticulous, thus succeeding. Like Wu Han and Zhu Ran, always vigilant as if facing the enemy. One must emulate this to prevail.”

== Family ==
Wu Wei
Marquis of Anyang; Wu Tong

Marquis of Loyalty of Guangping; Wu Han
Marquis Aiping of Guangping; Wu Cheng
Marquis of Yanyang; Wu Dan

Marquis Baoqin; Wu Xi
Marquis of Xincai; Wu Guo
Marquis of Pingchun; Wu Xu
Marquis of Pingchun; Wu Sheng

=== Brothers ===
- Wu Wei (吳尉): Wu Han’s elder brother, died in battle during campaigns; his son Wu Tong (吳彤) was enfeoffed as Marquis of Anyang.
- Wu Xi (吳翕): Wu Han’s younger brother, enfeoffed as Marquis Baoqin due to Wu Han’s great merits.
- Wu Yan (吳演): Wu Han’s fourth brother, a Great General; his son Wu Dan’s (吳丹) line ended without heirs.

=== Children ===
- Wu Cheng (吳成): Courtesy name Qiyang, inherited Wu Han’s title after his death. Posthumously named Marquis Aiping upon his death; in the twenty-eighth year of Jianwu (52 CE), his marquisate was split into three. His son Wu Dan was enfeoffed as Marquis of Yanyang, (Note: One of three marquisates split from the original Guangping Marquisate.) continuing Wu Han’s line, but died without heirs, ending his domain. Wu Dan’s brother Wu Xu (吳盱) was enfeoffed as Marquis of Zhuyang, later transferred to Marquis of Pingchun in the eighth year of Jianchu (83 CE), continuing Wu Han’s line after Wu Dan’s death. After Wu Xu’s death, Wu Sheng (吳胜) inherited the title.
- Wu Guo (吳國): Wu Cheng’s brother, enfeoffed as Marquis of Xincai in the twenty-eighth year of Jianwu, descendants’ details unclear.

=== Nephews ===
- Wu Tong (吳彤): Son of Wu Wei, inherited the title Marquis of Anyang.
- Wu Anguo (吳安國): Son of Wu Xi, enfeoffed as a marquis, relocated to Jiangdong.
- Wu Dan (吳丹): Son of Wu Yan, line ended without heirs.

=== Grandchildren ===
Wu Cheng’s heirs: Eldest son Wu Dan, second son Wu Xu, third son Wu Xuan (吳宣), fourth son Wu Xin (吳昕).

=== Great-Grandchildren ===
- Wu Sheng (吳勝): Also known as Wu Rusheng (吳如勝), son of Wu Xu, second Marquis of Pingchun; compiled the Wu family genealogy, fathered two sons: eldest Wu Yunzuo (吳允佐), second Wu Yuncheng (吳允承).

=== Great-Great-Grandchildren ===
- Wu Yuncheng: (Note: According to the Jiangyin Wutong Zongyuan Liukao (《江阴吴统宗源流考》), Wu Yuncheng's ancestor Wu Han was a son of the Confucian scholar Wu Zhang (吴章). Wu Zhang was executed in 3 CE by Wang Mang after Wu conspired with Wang Mang's son Wang Yu (王宇). Since the identity of Wu Ziyan's father was not recorded, it is likely that Wu Yuncheng's ancestor was not the same person as Wu Ziyan, but had the same name and surname. Wu Yuncheng's descendants include Wu Jing and his sister, maternal uncle and mother respectively of Sun Ce and Sun Quan.) In the second year of the Yongxing era (154) of the reign of Emperor Huan of Han, Wu Commandery Governor Mi Bao (麋豹) built the Wu Taibo Temple (吴太伯庙), and petitioned the court to find Wu descendants to oversee its rites. Wu Sheng presented the family’s genealogy (《世系》). An impressed Emperor Huan ordered officials like Grand Commandant Huang Qiong (黄琼) to enfeoff Wu Sheng’s second son Wu Yuncheng as Marquis of Ritual Service, relocating him to Wu Commandery to manage the temple. Upon his death, he was posthumously titled Marquis Wenxiao; his son Wu Tang (alias Wu Tuo, courtesy name Wenzhi) inherited the title and duties. Wu Tang, upon death, was titled Marquis Liang; his son Wu Xiongqing (courtesy name Yingzhi) succeeded, and the family thrived into the Wei and Jin eras.

== Legacy ==
For his accomplishments, Wu was created the Marquis of Guangping by Emperor Guangwu. When Wu died in 44, Emperor Guangwu ordered that he be buried with the same honors given to the great Western Han statesman Huo Guang.

== Influence ==
=== Legends ===
- Folklore links the Twenty-Eight Generals of the Cloud Terrace to the Twenty-Eight Lunar Mansions, with Wu Han corresponding to Kang Jin Long (Dragon of the Neck).
- The traditional play "Wu Han Kills His Wife" (《吳漢殺妻》) portrays Wu Han as Wang Mang’s son-in-law, urged by his mother to kill his wife to follow Liu Xiu, only for his wife to overhear and commit suicide. This contradicts history, and was debunked by Deng Tuo.

=== Film and television ===
- In Singing All Along, Cai Heng portrays Wu Han.

== Other references ==
- Rafe de Crespigny (2006). A Biographical Dictionary of Later Han to the Three Kingdoms (23–220 AD). Brill. pp. 867–. ISBN 978-9047411840.
- Official histories:
  - 《後漢書·吳蓋陳臧列傳第八》(History of Eastern Han, vol. 18)
  - 《後漢纪·光武皇帝紀》(Annals of the Later Han)
  - 《資治通鑑·漢纪》(Zizhi Tongjian)
- Others:
  - Conversions between Gregorian calendar and Chinese calendar in this article reference Academia Sinica’s Two Millennia Calendar Conversion Website (In Chinese.)
