= Singing All Along =

2016 Chinese historical drama television series

- Also known as
- Traditional Chinese: 秀麗江山之長歌行
- Simplified Chinese: 秀丽江山之长歌行
- Literal meaning: Splendid and Beautiful Rivers and Mountains: Long Journey of Songs
- Hanyu Pinyin: Xiùlì Jiāngshān Zhī Cháng Gē Xíng
- Genre: Historical fiction; Romance; Wuxia
- Based on: Xiuli Jiangshan by Li Xin
- Written by: Shao Sihan; Li Yanqian; Wang Xiaoquan
- Directed by: Lin Feng; Chen Quan
- Starring: Ruby Lin; Yuan Hong; Li Jiahang; Wang Yuanke; Zong Fengyan; Kenny Kwan; Yu Bo
- Country of origin: China
- Original language: Mandarin
- No. of episodes: 56

Production
- Executive producer: Han Luo
- Producer: Ruby Lin
- Running time: 45 minutes
- Production companies: Ruby Lin Studio; China International Television Corporation; Anhui Television; Shanghai Juhe Media Corporation; Four Seasons Culture Corporation
- Budget: ¥150 million

Original release
- Network: Jiangsu Television
- Release: 21 July 2016

Singing All Along is a 2016 Chinese television series produced by Ruby Lin, starring Lin and Yuan Hong. Set in 1st-century imperial China, the drama is based on Li Xin's (李歆) 2007–2009 romantic novel series Xiuli Jiangshan (秀丽江山) and focuses on the relationship between Liu Xiu (Emperor Guangwu), a peasant-turned-Eastern Han dynasty founder, and Yin Lihua (Empress Guanglie), the love of his life. Although the original novel involved time travel, the television series does not contain those parts.

Filming began in October 2013 in Xiangshan County, Zhejiang, China with a budget of ¥150 million (over US$24 million). The show premiered on Jiangsu Television on 21 July 2016.

== Synopsis ==
In 22 AD, the peasant brothers Liu Yan and Liu Xiu led a rebel force to overthrow the oppressive Xin empire and restore the Han dynasty. Yin Lihua, their beautiful childhood friend, joined their fight. During the bloody battles, Liu Xiu and Yin faced death many times together before the Xin empire was finally toppled. In 23, Liu Yan was seen by the new Han emperor Liu Xuan as a threat and killed. Fearing he would be next, Liu Xiu, with the help of his new bride Yin, managed to have Liu Xuan assign him to a territory beyond Liu Xuan's reach.

However, developing a power base of his own proved difficult. In 24, Liu Xiu encountered a dilemma: in order to enter a military alliance with a mighty regional warlord, he needed to marry the warlord's niece Guo Shengtong and break his vows to Yin. Meanwhile, Yin discovered that emperor Liu Xuan also had feelings for her. When Yin finally reunited with her husband in 25, Liu Xiu was already the new emperor who had just captured the capital; with Guo, a woman he did not love, as his new wife. As the empire remained divided, naming Guo the empress seemed the ideal choice politically, but Liu Xiu's heart never left Yin. Amid a struggle for power, war, and intrigues, could their love survive?

== Cast ==
=== Main ===
- Ruby Lin as Yin Lihua, Empress Guanglie of Han
- Yuan Hong as Liu Xiu, Emperor Guangwu of Han
- Yu Bo as Liu Xuan, the Gengshi Emperor
- Zong Fengyan as Liu Yan, Liu Xiu's eldest brother
- Kenny Kwan as Deng Yu, first of the Yuntai 28 generals
- Li Jiahang as Feng Yi, seventh of the Yuntai 28 generals
- Wang Yuanke as Guo Shengtong, Liu Xiu's second wife

=== Yin family ===
- Ren Quan as Yin Lu, Lihua's father
- Qi Wei as Cai Weiyue, Lihua's mother
- Xu Yang as Lady Deng, Yin Shi's mother
- Wang Yu as Yin Shi, Lihua's elder half-brother
- Liu Yuexin as Lady Liu, Yin Shi's wife
- Mao Zijun as Yin Xing, Lihua's younger brother
- Queenie Tai as Hupo, Yin Xing's concubine
- Liu Chenyi as Yin Jiu, Lihua's youngest brother
- Hu Kun as Deng Chen, Lihua's cousin
- Hong Siao-ling as Deng Chan, Deng Chen's younger sister
- Lee Li-chun as Cai Shaogong, Lihua's maternal uncle
- Wu Jinyan as Xu Yanzhi, Lihua's servant
- Zhou Bin as Yuchi Jun
- Guo Ruixi as Yuchi Shanan, Lihua's servant

=== Liu Xiu's family ===
- Li Jinsheng as Liu Chang
- Yue Junling as Liu Liang, Liu Xiu's uncle
- Tian Miao as Lady Fan, Liu Xiu's mother
- Wang Bin as Liu Zhong, Liu Xiu's elder brother
- Zheng Yijiang as Liu Huang, Liu Xiu's eldest sister
- Chi Lijing as Liu Yuan, Liu Xiu's elder sister & Deng Chen's wife
- Bai Huizi as Liu Boji, Liu Xiu's younger sister & Li Tong's wife
- Dai Xuyi as Liu Jia, Liu Xiu's cousin
- Lu Quanyu as Liu Zhang, Liu Yan's eldest son
- Yu Bingxuan as Liu Xing, Liu Yan's second son
- Qiu Shuang as Liu Qiang, Liu Xiu's eldest son by Shengtong
- Chen Boyi as Liu Fu, Liu Xiu's second son by Shengtong
- Zhao Wenhao as Liu Yang, Liu Xiu's fourth son by Lihua
- Ye Xuanchen as Liu Heng, Liu Xiu's ninth son by Lihua
- Zhao Yuwu as Fan Zhong, Liu Xiu's maternal grandfather
- Cao Jiqiang as Fan Hong, Liu Xiu's maternal uncle
- Wang Chenyixian as Liu Liliu, Liu Xiu's daughter by Shengtong
- Liu Chengming as Liu Yang, Shengtong's maternal uncle
- Wang Lin as Lady Liu, Shengtong's mother
- Liu Changde as Guo Kuang, Shengtong's elder brother
- Deng Ning as Liu Ji
- Shen Jianing as Yingluo, Shengtong's servant

=== Yuntai 28 generals ===
- Cai Heng as Wu Han, second of the Yuntai 28 generals
- Jin Hao as Geng Yan, fourth of the Yuntai 28 generals
- Cui Tonghe as Kou Xun, fifth of the Yuntai 28 generals
- Zhao Changzhou as Cen Peng, sixth of the Yuntai 28 generals
- Xin Xin as Zhu Hu, eighth of the Yuntai 28 generals
- Liu Jun as Zhai Zun, ninth of the Yuntai 28 generals
- Liu Yang as Ge Yan, 11th of the Yuntai 28 generals
- Wang Liang as Yao Qi, 12th of the Yuntai 28 generals
- Zhang Shuo as Geng Chun, 13th of the Yuntai 28 generals
- Jiang Zhenhao as Zang Gong, 14th of the Yuntai 28 generals
- Wang Jinduo as Ma Wu, 15th of the Yuntai 28 generals
- Ruan Jingtian as Liu Long, 16th of the Yuntai 28 generals
- Yao Qi as Wang Liang, 18th of the Yuntai 28 generals
- Wei Tianci as Fu Jun, 21st of the Yuntai 28 generals
- Wang Zirui as Wang Ba, 23rd of the Yuntai 28 generals
- Wang Han as Ren Guang, 24th of the Yuntai 28 generals
- Lin Junli as Li Zhong, 25th of the Yuntai 28 generals
- Du Yuanzao as Wan Xiu, 26th of the Yuntai 28 generals
- Shao Jia as Pi Tong, 27th of the Yuntai 28 generals
- Chen Xiaotao as Liu Zhi, 28th of the Yuntai 28 generals

=== Liu Xuan's family ===
- Liu Yitong as Lady Han, Liu Xuan's wife then concubine
- Sun Xiaoxiao as Lady Zhao, Liu Xuan's concubine
- Wu Hanfeng as Liu Qiu, Liu Xuan's eldest son by Lady Han
- Xu Zizheng as Liu Li, Liu Xuan's third son by Lady Han
- Gao Sen as Zhao Meng, Lady Zhao's father
- Chen Junhan as Zhao Xin
- Zhao Wei as Zhu Wei
- You Yong as Wang Chang
- Zhang Jingjia as Zhang Ang
- Zhang Jinglun as Cheng Dan
- Chen Tao as Wang Feng
- Liu Jianwei as Wang Kuang
- Pang Tanwei as Xie Gong
- Ma Kun as Chen Mu
- Chen Yajun as Li Shu
- Liu Shuai as Shen Tujian
- Liu Sihan as Cui'er, Lady Zhao's servant

=== Xin dynasty ===
- Liu Xinyi as Wang Mang
- Zhong Lin as Wang Xun, Wang Mang's nephew
- Sun Mingming as Ju Wuba
- Yang Jun as Wang Yi
- Liu Zhiyun as Yan You
- Tang Zhiyang as Zhen Fu

=== Li family ===
- Li Zhuolin as Li Tong
- Zhang Junzhu as Li Jun, Li Tong's younger sister
- Xiao Haoran as Li Yi, Li Tong's cousin
- Zhang Hongge as Li Song, Li Tong's second cousin

=== Hebei ===
- Xu Feng as Liu Lin
- Chang Jin as Wang Lang

=== Feng family ===
- Cui Liming as Feng Yi's father
- Zheng Jiaxue as Lady Lü, Feng Yi's second wife
- Reyizha Alimjan as Ding Rou, Feng Yi's concubine
- Zhang Yu as Feng Zhang, Feng Yi's son

=== Other ===
- Qin Junjie as Deng Feng, Deng Chen's nephew
- Ma Tianyu as Yan Ziling
- Sun Honglei as Guo Xian
- Zheng Yecheng as Deng Yu (young)

== Soundtrack ==
- Opening theme song: "Beautiful Rivers and Mountains" (秀丽江山) by Van Fan
- Ending theme song: "Beauty and the Land" (红颜江山) by Ruby Lin

== International broadcast ==
Network	Country	Airing Date	Timeslot
Jiangsu Television	China	July 21, 2016	Mon–Sun 19:30–21:20 p.m.
Channel Ginga	Japan	January 23, 2017	Mon–Fri 23:00–24:00 p.m.
TVB Chinese Drama	Hong Kong	December 16, 2016	Saturday 22:30–23:30 p.m.
J5	Hong Kong		
Talentvision TV	Canada	December 2, 2016	Mon–Fri 20:30–21:30 p.m.
Astro Quan Jia HD	Malaysia	November 23, 2016	Mon–Fri 19:00–20:00 p.m.
Channel Ching	South Korea	December 15, 2016	Mon–Fri 18:00–20:00 p.m.
China Television	Taiwan	January 10, 2017	Mon–Fri 21:00–22:00 p.m.
