= 28 generals of the Cloud Terrace =

Chinese Eastern Han generals, painted 60 CE

In 60 CE, Emperor Ming of the Eastern Han dynasty honored 28 founding generals of the dynasty, who had served his father Emperor Guangwu, by painting their portraits on the Cloud Terrace (Yuntai) of the South Palace in the capital Luoyang. They became known as the twenty-eight generals of the Cloud Terrace (or Yuntai) (雲台二十八將).

One criterion Emperor Ming used for his selection was that the men honored must not be relatives of the imperial family. Thus, Ma Yuan (whose daughter was Emperor Ming's empress) and Lai Xi (来歙, Emperor Guangwu's uncle-in-law) were not selected, despite their great contributions.

Unusual in Chinese history, the 28 generals all had natural deaths or died while in service to Emperor Guangwu. Guangwu himself was lauded for his trust of these men who helped him forge his empire.

== Order ==
Note:

1. Grand Tutor, Marquis of Gaomi, Deng Yu (鄧禹)
2. Grand Marshal, Marquis of Guangping, Wu Han (吳漢)
3. Left general, Marquis of Jiaodong, Jia Fu (賈復)
4. Grand general who establishes might, Marquis of Haozhi, Geng Yan (耿弇)
5. Commander of the capital guards, Marquis of Yongnu, Kou Xun (寇恂)
6. Grand general who conquers the south, Marquis of Wuyang, Cen Peng (岑彭)
7. Grand general who conquers the west, Marquis of Yangxia, Feng Yi (馮異)
8. Grand general who establishes virtue, Marquis of Ge, Zhu Hu (朱祜)
9. General who conquers barbarians, Marquis of Yingyang, Zhai Zun (祭遵)
10. Grand general of swift cavalry, Marquis of Yueyang Jing Dan (景丹)
11. Grand general of the tiger corps, Marquis of Anping, Ge Yan (蓋延)
12. Commander of the palace guards, Marquis of Ancheng, Yao Qi (銚期)
13. Governor of Dong, Marquis of Dongguang, Geng Chun (耿純)
14. Colonel of the capital gate, Marquis of Langling, Zang Gong (臧宮)
15. General who captures barbarians, Marquis of Yangxu, Ma Wu (馬武)
16. General of swift cavalry, Marquis of Shen, Liu Long (劉隆)
17. Governor of Zhongshan, Marquis of Quanjiao, Ma Cheng (馬成)
18. Governor of Henan, Marquis of Fucheng, Wang Liang (王梁)
19. Governor of Langya, Marquis of Zhu'e, Chen Jun (陳俊)
20. Grand general of swift cavalry, Marquis of Canqu, Du Mao (杜茂)
21. General of repeating crossbow, Marquis of Kunyang, Fu Jun (傅俊)
22. Left minister of war, Marquis of Hefei, Jian Tan (堅鐔)
23. Governor of Shanggu, Marquis of Huailing, Wang Ba (王覇)
24. Governor of Xindu, Marquis of Eling, Ren Guang (任光)
25. Governor of Yuzhang, Marquis of Zhongshui, Li Zhong (李忠)
26. Right general, Marquis of Huaili, Wan Xiu (萬脩)
27. Minister of ceremonies, Marquis of Lingshou, Pi Tong (邳彤)
28. General of brave cavalry, Marquis of Changcheng, Liu Zhi (劉植)

== Other honorees ==
In addition to the 28 generals, Emperor Ming hung the portraits of four other men in the Cloud Terrace. They are:

1. Wang Chang (王常)
2. Li Tong (李通); Li was also Emperor Ming's uncle-in-law as his wife is Emperor Ming's aunt (and Emperor Guangwu's sister) Liu Boji.
3. Dou Rong (窦融)
4. Zhuo Mao (卓茂)

== See also ==
- Lingyan Pavilion, where Tang emperors from Taizong onwards honored officials in a similar manner.
