= Zhang Bu =

Zhang Bu may refer to:

- Zhang Bu (warlord) (died 32), warlord during the Xin–Eastern Han transition
- Zhang Bu (Eastern Wu) (died 264), Eastern Wu general
