= Zhang Bu (warlord) =

Zhang Bu (Chinese: 張步, died 32 AD), courtesy name Wengong (文公), was a major warlord in Eastern China (mainly in Shandong) during the Xin and early Eastern Han periods. He was from Langya Commandery in Xu Province.

== As a warlord ==
In 22, when Liu Xiu and others revolted against Wang Mang, Zhang Bu and his brothers also led thousands of soldiers and conquered, first his hometown Buji County (不其縣, in modern Qingdao), and later, the entire Langya Commandery. He called himself the Five Majestic General (五威将軍).

In 23, the Han Gengshi Emperor (Liu Xuan) in Luoyang began a policy of recognizing independent warlords in hopes of winning their support. Liu dispatched messengers to Zhang Bu and granted him the title General-in-Chief Who Supports Han (輔漢大將軍). Zhang Bu's brothers Zhang Hong (張弘), Zhang Lan (張藍), and Zhang Shou (張壽) all received titles. Meanwhile, Zhang Bu enlarged his territory by capturing the Taishan, Chengyang, Donglai, Gaomi, Jiaodong, Beihai, Qi, and Jinan Commanderies, gaining effective control of most of the Shandong Peninsula. The Gengshi Emperor tried to test Zhang Bu's "loyalty" by sending Wang Hong (王閎) to Langya to serve as its administrator, but Zhang Bu refused to let him take office. Wang Hong attacked Zhang Bu and took Ganyu and five other counties, but was unable to overcome Zhang Bu's dominance in the area.

In 24, the Prince of Liang Liu Yong turned against the Gengshi Emperor and became independent. Seeking Zhang Bu's support, Liu Yong confirmed his title, gave him the enfeoffment Marquis Zhongjie (忠節侯, "the loyal and continent marquis"), and granted him the right to Qing Province and Xu Province. Zhang Bu accepted this arrangement. Their alliance frightened Wang Hong, who decided to submit to Zhang Bu and become his subordinate. Zhang Bu allowed him to administer Langya Commandery.

In 26, Liu Xiu (Emperor Guangwu of Han) defeated Liu Yong and sent Fu Long (伏隆) to Zhang Bu to solicit his allegiance. Zhang Bu sent a messenger to go to Luoyang with Fu Long as a show of submission.

In 27, however, Liu Xiu only named Zhang Bu the Administrator of Donglai even though Zhang controlled twelve commanderies. On the other hand, Liu Yong gave Zhang Bu the title Prince of Qi (齊王), so Zhang Bu executed Fu Long and switched his allegiance to Liu Yong. Soon, Liu Yong was defeated and killed, so Zhang Bu sought alliance with the warlord Peng Chong (彭寵). Heeding Wang Hong's advice, Zhang Bu also refused to recognize Liu Yong's son Liu Yu (劉紆).

== Defeat and surrender ==
In 28, Liu Xiu began his offensive against Zhang Bu. The imperial army under Chen Jun (陳俊) quickly conquered the western part of Taishan and defeated Zhang Bu in a battle at Ying. Later, the Han general Geng Yan helped in the conquest of Taishan. The Han army then focused on eliminating Liu Yu.

In 29, after Liu Yu's defeat, a Han army was assembled under Geng Yan to invade Zhang Bu's territory. Geng Yan crossed the Yellow River at Pingyuan Commandery and destroyed three of Zhang's armies placed at his flank. Zhang Bu retreated but when he counterattacked, was decisively destroyed after a two-day battle. Zhang Bu fled to Beihai and joined the warlord Su Mao (蘇茂). The Han sent envoys to both Zhang and Su, urging them to kill the other and surrender. Zhang Bu was the first to act: he decapitated Su Mao and surrendered with his three brothers and Wang Hong. As promised, he received his marquisate, and he moved with his family and brothers to Luoyang.

== Death ==
In 32, while Emperor Guangwu was away in the west, Zhang Bu took his family and tried to escape to his former territory with his brothers. Chen Jun, now Administrator of Langya, intercepted them and killed everyone.
