= Ma Wu =

Eastern Han dynasty general

- Traditional Chinese: 馬武
- Simplified Chinese: 马武
Transcriptions
Standard Mandarin
- Hanyu Pinyin: Mǎ Wǔ
- Wade–Giles: Ma Wu

Courtesy name
- Traditional Chinese: 子張
- Simplified Chinese: 子张
Transcriptions
Standard Mandarin
- Hanyu Pinyin: Zǐzhāng
- Wade–Giles: Tzu-chang

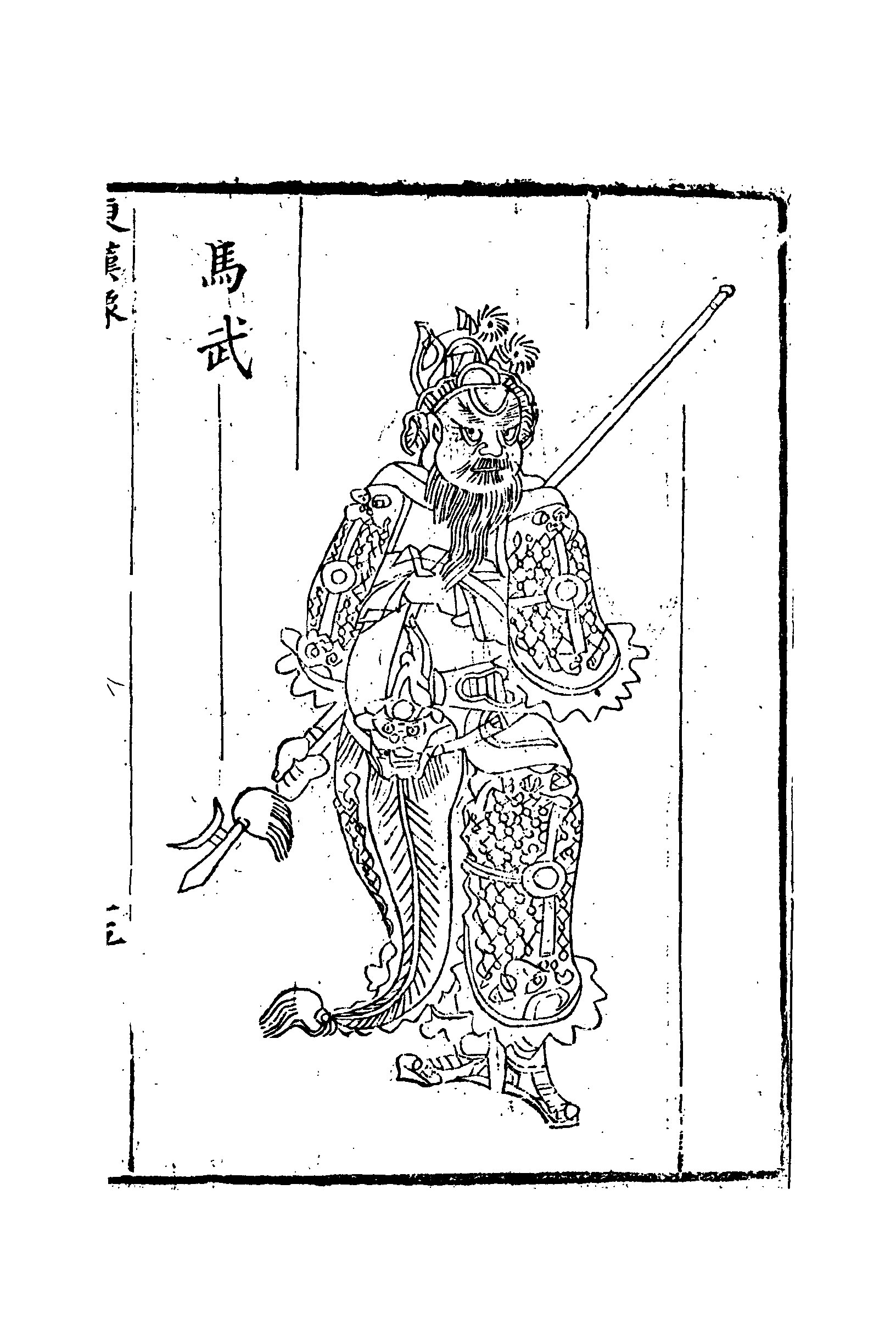
Ma Wu depicted in Commentary on the Romance of the Eastern Han Dynasty

Ma Wu (d. AD 61), courtesy name Zizhang, was a Chinese general during the Eastern Han, who hailed from the Huyang Town, Tanghe, located in the Henan province. He was ranked 15th among the 28 Generals of Yuntai. He appeared as a figure in the Book of the Later Han and sometimes deified as a door god in Taoist pantheon, together with Yao Qi. He is also linked to a star deity called Kuimulang.

In battle, he used the halberd and a steel mace. After joining future Emperor Liu Xiu's rebellion, Ma Wu began to fight hard for his country. He was the only person who hated the incumbent evil rulers of his time. He wanted to see his country prosper, and saw Liu Xiu as the man who could make it happen. He was a brave, strong and capable military strategist of his time.
