= Zhai Zun =

1st century CE Eastern Han dynasty general

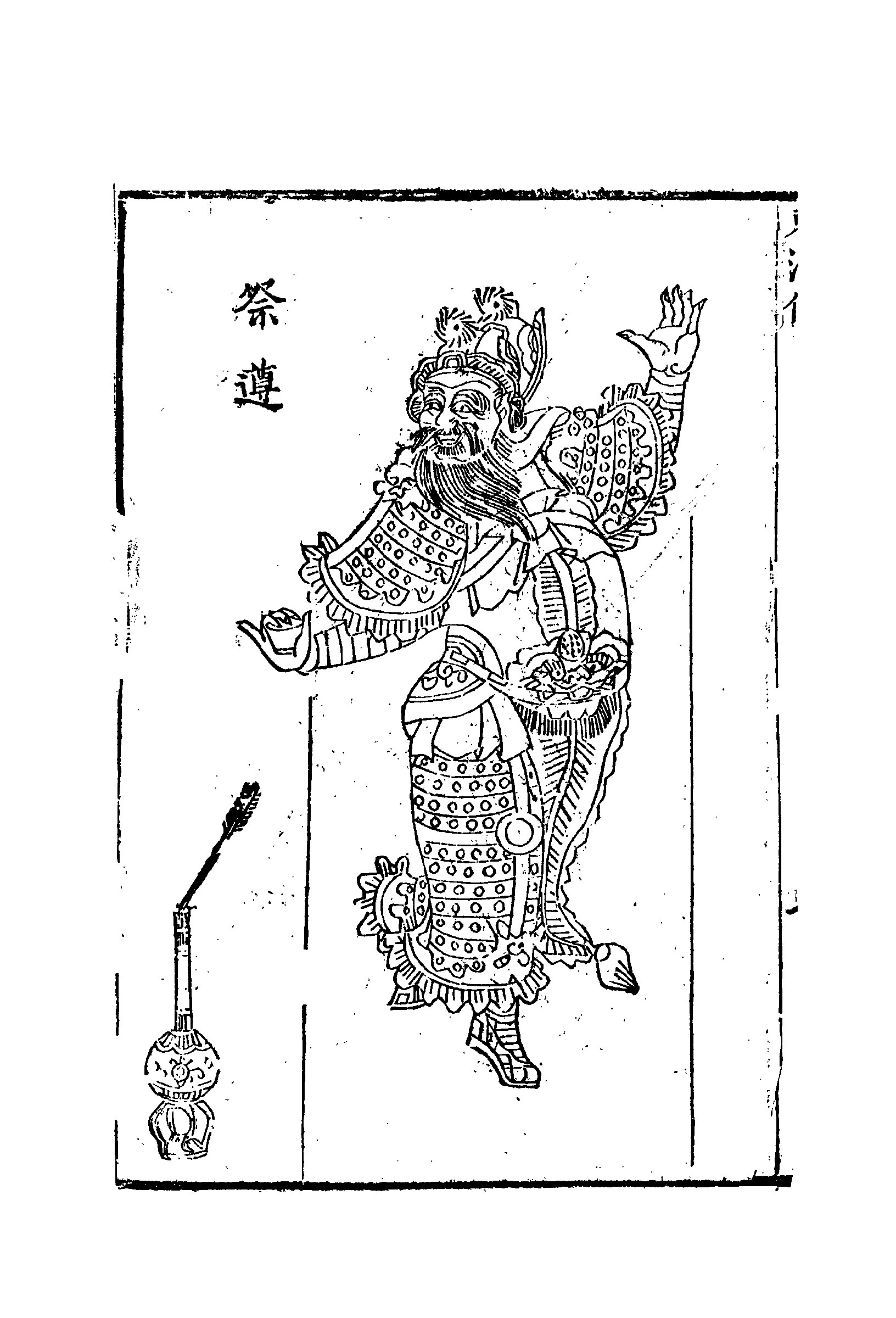
Zhai Zun

Zhai Zun (Chinese: 祭尊; pinyin: Zhài Zūn; died 33 CE), courtesy name Disun (弟孫), was a Chinese military general during the Han dynasty.

A native of Yingchuan in Anhui, Zhai Zun joined Liu Xiu (the later Emperor Guangwu) and rose to high military command. He was in command in battles against the southern barbarians and aided in the overthrow of Wei Xiao (隗囂). A stern disciplinarian, he put to death his own son for breaching the law. He wore ordinary leather breeches and cotton socks, distributing all his booty among his soldiers. His soldiers were strictly forbidden to pillage. Rather he sought to occupy their leisure hours with refined and intellectual amusements. Even in war time, he ensured that the usual religious ceremonies were not neglected.

He was ennobled as Marquis and canonised as Cheng (成). Later his portrait, was hung in the Yuntai (雲臺) gallery by Emperor Ming in 60 CE and he was ranked no.9 out of the 28 Generals of Yuntai.
