= Wang Lang (Xin dynasty) =

Early 1st century AD leader of a revolt against the Xin Dynasty

Wang Lang (Chinese: 王郎; died c.late May 24), originally named Wang Chang (王昌), became a leader of one of the revolts that rose up towards the end of the Xin dynasty by pretending to be a son of Emperor Cheng of Han. Originally a native of the Zhao State, he was acclaimed as emperor and managed to briefly establish an independent regime in the area of Hebei.

== Life ==
Wang Lang began his working life as a fortune teller, with expertise in astronomy and calendrics, who determined that Hebei had the qi of a Son of Heaven.

Before Wang Mang established the Xin dynasty in AD 9, there was a man living in Chang'an named Liu Ziyu (刘子輿) who claimed to be the son of Emperor Cheng of Han. When Liu Ziyu was murdered on the orders of the Xin dynasty emperor Wang Mang, Wang Lang took the opportunity to pretend to be the real Liu Ziyu. Together with Liu Lin (劉林), son of king Miao of Zhao (赵缪王), he claimed that in order to avoid Empress Zhao Feiyan's persecutions they had fled to Sichuan, and knowing that Hebei had the qi of the Son of Heaven. Liu Lin planned, with the support of the powerful families of Li Yu (李育) and Zhang Can (張参), to declare Wang Lang emperor.

At that time there was a rumour that the Red Eyebrows army was crossing the Yellow River heading north. In c.November 23, Gengshi Emperor had ordered General Liu Xiu and acting minister of war to pacify Hebei. Upon visiting the city of Handan, Liu Xiu met with Liu Lin, who suggested opening the dams in order to drown the Hebei Red Eyebrows troops. Liu Xiu declined this option, and moved on north, towards Zhending State (真定).

In c.January 24, Liu Lin led several hundred horsemen into the city of Handan, and in the early morning arrived at the palace of King Miao of Zhao. Wang Lang was then named emperor. Wang Lang nominated Liu Lin as prime minister, Li Yu Minister of War, and Zhang Can Great General. Wang Lang's army occupied the Ji (冀) and You (幽) counties, and took advantage of the public's positive attitude towards the Han dynasty by claiming that the general Di Yi who opposed Wang Mang before the Xin dynasty was established, had not yet died and was in support of them. This gained them much popularity and support amongst the populace. Wang Lang controlled the state of Zhao from its north, and Liaodong peninsula from its eastern end, and offered a price of ten marquise-level bronze vessels for anyone who would bring the severed head of Liu Xiu.

However, by the beginning of 24 AD, Liu Xiu had gathered troops and consolidated power with Liu Zhi and Geng Chun leading over two thousand troops to back him. Geng Kuang (耿況), the governor of Shanggu and Peng Chong, the governor of Yuyang Commandery (漁陽), sent cavalry to provide support to Liu Xiu.

With all the forces now available to Liu Xiu, Wang Lang suffered a series of defeats in Hebei. In c.May 24, Liu Xiu marched on Handan; on 27 May, the city of Handan was conquered. Wang Lang escaped from Handan but was soon caught and killed. According to the Book of the Later Han, he was killed by Wang Ba, one of Liu Xiu's generals.
