= Feng Yi =

Chinese general who helped Emperor Guangwu establish the Eastern Han dynasty (died 34)

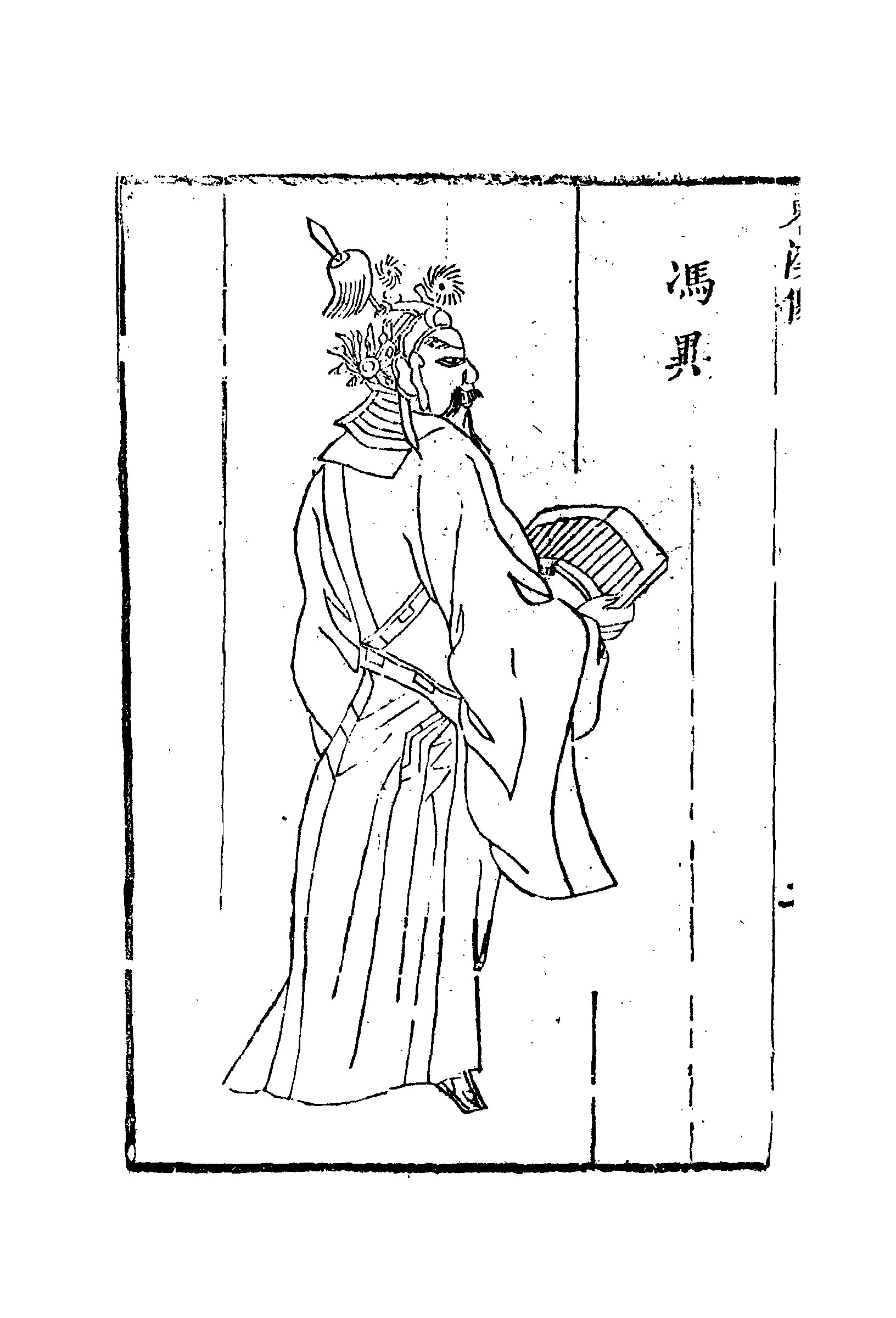
- Traditional Chinese: 馮異
- Simplified Chinese: 冯异
Transcriptions
Standard Mandarin
- Hanyu Pinyin: Féng Yì

Feng Yi (? – AD 34) was a Chinese military general of the Eastern Han dynasty, who helped Emperor Guangwu of Han establish the Eastern Han dynasty. One of his greatest contributions was the final defeat of the Red Eyebrows rebels.

By 23 AD Feng Yi was supervisor of five counties for the Xin dynasty, he was captured by Liu Xiu (who later became Emperor Guangwu) that summer and agreed to switch his support to his rebellion.

He was famous for his modest character; he would sit under a tree while other generals received rewards for their conquests. For this reason, he was called The Big Tree General (大树将军). Emperor Guangwu's son Emperor Ming of Han later honored 28 men who had served his father well by painting their portraits on a palace tower; these men became known as the 28 generals of Yuntai (云台二十八将). Feng's portrait was placed in the 7th position.
