= Liu Yong (Xin dynasty) =

1st century AD Chinese general and politician

Liu Yong (劉永; 1st century BC? - AD 27) was a general and politician of the Xin dynasty and early Eastern Han dynasty. He was born in Suiyang County, Liang Commandery, Yuzhou (present-day Suiyang District, Shangqiu, Henan). A member of the Han imperial family, he was the son of Liu Li, Prince of Liang, and an 8th-generation descendant of Liu Wu, Prince of Liang.

== Biography ==
=== Early life ===
Liu's father, Liu Li, had contact with Emperor Ping of Han's grandfather Wei, and Yuanshi was killed by Wang Mang. In AD 23 Liu Xuan assumed the position of Emperor Gengshi and entered Luoyang. Liu Yong was named the Prince of Liang and Suiyang (Liang Commandery) was his capital. After hearing of Emperor Gengshi's chaotic rule, Liu Yong began to act independently. Liu Yong appointed his brother Liu Fang as his chief general, his younger brother Liu Shaogong as the Secretary of the Royal History, and sealed the Shaogong Prince of Lu. Zhou Jian was appointed to recruit heroes as generals, attacking Jiyin, Shanyang, Pei, Chu, Huaiyang, and Runan Commanderies, gaining 28 cities. Liu Yong to win over the neighbors of the pack, the appointment of Xifang (Shanyang Commandery) Jiao Jiang as rampant general, Donghai Commandery constitution for the wing Dong Han Grand General, supplemented by Qi Zhang Bu Han Grand General, the Yuzhou, Yanzhou, Qingzhou, Xuzhou part of the Commandery area incorporated under the rule.

=== Self-proclaimed emperor ===
In AD 25, after Emperor Gengshi was defeated by the Chimei Army, Liu Yong proclaimed himself emperor. In the summer of AD 26, Emperor Guangwu sent General Gai Yan and General Su Mao to fight against Liu Yong. But Su Mao changed sides and joined Liu Yong who appointed Su Mao as the minister of war and prince of Huaiyang. After Gai Yan conquered Suiyang, Liu Yong fled to Yu (Liang Commandery). But the people of Yu rebelled against Liu Yong and killed his mother and wife. So Liu Yong then fled to Qiao (Pei Commandery). Su Mao, Jiaoqiang and Zhou Jian came to rescue Liu Yong and were defeated by Gai Yan. Jiaoqiang and Zhou Jian followed Liu Yong to retreat to Huling in Shanyang Commandery.

In the spring of AD 27, Liu Yong named Zhang Bu as Prince of Qi and Dong Xian as Prince of Haixi. Han Army minister of war Wu Han attacked Su Mao and Guang Lecheng (Liang Commandery, Yu County). Su Mao was defeated and fled to Huling. The people of Suiyang opposed the Han army and welcomed Liu Yong. Wu Han, Gai Yan Army surrounded Suiyang, Liu Yong, Su Mao, Zhou Jian escaped the city with food. When they fled, Liu Yong's general Qing Wu killed Liu Yong and reported the death to Emperor Guangwu. Emperor Guangwu rewarded Qing Wu with a noble title.

== Legacy ==
After Liu Yong's death, Su Mao and Zhou Jian supported Liu Yong's son, Liu Yu, to succeed as Prince of Liang and continue the fight against the Han. However, during August AD 29, Liu Yu's Tanhai Commandery was captured. He was killed by his soldiers led by Gao Hu which marked the end of the Prince of Liang's regime.

== Bibliography ==
- Book of Later Han 列传 Liu Yong传
- Book of Han
- Li Shi, The Military History in Qin and Han Dynasty
