= List of people with the Chinese family name Liu =

Liu is the fourth most common surname in Mainland China. It is shared by nearly 70 million people. This is a list of notable people with the Chinese family name Liu.

== Historical figures ==
- Liu Bang, Founder of the Han dynasty as Emperor Gaozu of Han
- Liu Jiao (King of Chu), the younger brother of Liu Bang and famous scholar
- Liu Ying, Second Emperor of the Han dynasty
- Liu Heng, Fifth Emperor of the Han dynasty
- Liu Qi, Sixth Emperor of the Han dynasty
- Liu Che, Seventh Emperor of the Han dynasty known for expanding the Han dynasty to its fullest extent and for a long reign of 54 years
- Liu An (King of Huainan), advisor to his nephew, Emperor Wu of Han. Best known for editing the (139 BCE) Huainanzi compendium of Daoist, Confucianist, and Legalist teachings
- Liu Sheng (King of Zhongshan), the direct ancestor of the Shu Han emperors, had more than 120 sons
- Liu Xiang, government official, scholar, and author of who lived during the Han dynasty
- Liu Fuling, Emperor of the Han dynasty
- Liu He, Emperor of the Han dynasty
- Liu Xun, Emperor of the Han dynasty
- Liu Shi, Emperor of the Han dynasty
- Liu Ao, Emperor of the Han dynasty
- Liu Xin, Emperor of the Han dynasty
- Liu Kan, Emperor of the Han dynasty
- Liu Xin, astronomer, historian, and editor during the Han dynasty
- Liu Xuan, Emperor Gengshi of the Han dynasty
- Liu Yan (Xin dynasty), general and older brother of Liu Xiu
- Liu Xiu, The restorer of the Han dynasty and the founding emperor of the Eastern Han dynasty
- Liu Dai, politician during the Eastern Han dynasty
- Liu Du (warlord), warlord and politician during the Eastern Han dynasty
- Liu Yan (Han dynasty warlord), politician and warlord during the Eastern Han dynasty
- Liu Biao, warlord during the late Eastern Han dynasty
- Liu Zhuang, Emperor of the Han dynasty
- Liu Da, Emperor of the Han dynasty
- Liu Zhao, Emperor of the Han dynasty
- Liu Hu, Emperor of the Han dynasty
- Liu Bao, Emperor of the Han dynasty
- Liu Zhi, Emperor of the Han dynasty
- Liu Hong, Emperor of the Han dynasty
- Liu Xie, Last emperor of the Han dynasty
- Liu Bei (161–223), Founding emperor of Shu Han
- Liu Shan (207–271), Second emperor of Shu Han
- Liu Hong, astronomer and mathematician of the Han dynasty
- Liu Hui, mathematician during The Three Kingdoms period
- Liu Yan (Shu Han), general during the Three Kingdoms period
- Liu Ji (Three Kingdoms), official of Eastern Wu
- Liu Kun, general, poet and musician of the Western Jin
- Liu Yuan, First emperor of Han Zhao
- Liu He, Second emperor of Han Zhao
- Liu Cong, Third emperor of Han Zhao
- Liu Can, Fourth emperor of Han Zhao
- Liu Yao, Fifth emperor of Han Zhao
- Emperor Wu of Liu Song, First emperor of Liu Song
- Emperor Shao of Liu Song, Second emperor of Liu Song
- Emperor Wen of Liu Song, Third emperor of Liu Song
- Empress Liu, Empress of Northern Song
- Liu Sanjie, folk music singer during the Southern Song dynasty
- Liu Zhiyuan, Founding emperor of Later Han
- Liu Chong, Founding emperor of Northern Han
- Liu Yan, Founding emperor of Southern Han
- Liu Rengui, chancellor and general of the Tang dynasty
- Liu Xiangdao, chancellor of the Tang dynasty
- Liu Ji (general), general of the Tang dynasty
- Liu Ji (Tang chancellor), chancellor of the Tang dynasty
- Liu Yan (Tang dynasty), Chinese economist and politician during the Tang dynasty
- Liu Zhan, chancellor and official of the Tang dynasty
- Liu Chongwang, chancellor of the Tang dynasty
- Liu Zhangqing, famous poet and politician
- Liu Yuxi, famous poet and statesman
- Liu Kezhuang, famous poet of southern song
- Liu Xu, chancellor of Later Tang and Later Jin
- Liu Bingzhong, chancellor of the Yuan dynasty
- Liu Bowen, famous poet, statesman, strategist and thinker
- Liu Tongxun, politician of the Qing dynasty
- Liu Yong, politician and calligrapher of the Qing dynasty
- Liu Mingchuan, First Governor of Taiwan
- Liu Ji (politician), (1887–1967), 11th Republic-era mayor of Beijing.

== Business ==
- Liu Qiangdong, (born 1973), internet entrepreneur and founder of Jd.com
- Liu Chuanzhi, (born 1944), Chinese businessman and founder of Lenovo
- Yu Liu (entrepreneur), (born 1986), Chinese entrepreneur
- Liu Yiqian, (born 1963), autodidact billionaire investor and art collector.
- Pete Lau (aka Liu Zuohu; born 1975), Chinese entrepreneur and co-founder of OnePlus
- Betty Liu (born 1973), Executive Vice Chairman of the New York Stock Exchange
- K. J. Ray Liu (born 1961), Chinese-American scientist, educator, and entrepreneur

== Entertainment ==
=== General ===
- Liu Wen (born 1988), fashion model
- Liu Wei (artist), Chinese artist
- Liu Yan (dancer), (born 1982), classical Chinese dancer
- Sam Liu, American animation producer
- Wyna Liu, puzzle editor

=== Actors and actresses ===
- Lucy Liu, American actress
- Liu Yifei, singer/actress
- Liu Shishi, (born 1987), Chinese actress
- Jasper Liu, (born 1986), Taiwanese actor, model, and musician
- Liu Haoran, Chinese actor
- Liu Tao, (born 1978), Chinese actress
- Liu Haikuan, (born 1994), Chinese actor
- Liu Ruilin, (born 1990), Chinese actor
- Hawick Lau, Chinese actor
- Liu Tong (actor), (born 1993), Chinese actor and model
- Natasha Liu Bordizzo, Australian Chinese actress
- Nina Liu, Australian actress
- Liu Yun (actress), (born 1982), Chinese actress
- Carina Lau, (born 1965), Hong Kong-Canadian actress and director
- Andy Lau, Hong Kong actor, singer
- Liu Ye, (born 1978), Chinese actor
- Liu Yan (actress), (born 1980), Chinese actress and singer
- Andrew Lau, Hong Kong filmmaker and actor
- Liu Yijun (actor), (born 1970), Chinese actor
- Winnie Lau, (born 1971), Hong Kong singer and actress
- Annie Liu, (born 1981), Hong Kong actress
- Esther Liu, (born 1988), Taiwanese actress
- Lau Kong, (born 1946), Hong Kong actor
- Jeffrey Lau, (born 1955), Hong Kong director and actor
- Moon Lau, (born 1989), Hong Kong actress
- Constance Lau, (born 1991), Singaporean actress and model
- Vincent Lau, (born 2001), Hong Kong actor
- Liu Xueyi, (born 1990), Chinese actor
- Liu Xiaoqing, (born 1955), Chinese actress and businesswoman
- Liu Kuan-ting, (born 1988), Taiwanese actor
- Leanne Liu, (born 1959) Hong Kong actress
- Lau Kar-Leung, (1934–2013), Chinese actor and martial artist
- Laurence Lau, (born 1954), American actor
- Sean Lau, (born 1964), Hong Kong actor
- Damian Lau, (born 1949), Hong Kong actor
- Tats Lau, Hong Kong actor and musician
- John Liu (actor), (born 1944), Taiwanese actor and martial artist
- Tony Liu, (born 1952), Hong Kong actor and martial artist
- Serena Liu, (1975–2020), Taiwanese dancer and actress
- Lau Dan, Chinese actor
- Lau Kar-leung, actor, choreographer and director
- Dyana Liu, American actress
- Patricia Liu, Hong Kong actress
- Gordon Liu, Chinese martial arts film actor
- Liu Haocun, Chinese actress
- Dallas Liu, American actor
- Simu Liu, (born 1989), Chinese-Canadian actor

=== Members of boy bands ===
- Henry Lau, Chinese-Canadian singer, member of Super Junior-M
- Liu Yangyang (born 2000), Taiwanese singer, member of WayV
- Liu Yuning, (born 1990), Chinese actor and singer, member of Modern Brothers
- Liu Yaowen, (born 2005), Chinese actor, dancer and singer, member of Teens In Times (时代少年团)

=== Members of girl groups ===
- Amber Liu (singer) (born 1992), singer and rapper, member of South Korean girl group f(x) (musical group)
- Liu Yuxin (singer), (born 1997), singer and rapper, member of Chinese girl group The9
- Liu Xiening, (born 1996), Chinese singer and dancer and former member of South Korean girl group Gugudan
- Tasha Low (born 1993), Singaporean singer, former leader of South Korean girl group, Skarf

=== Musical performers ===
- Lexie Liu, Chinese singer, rapper and songwriter
- Will Liu, Taiwanese singer
- Liu Wen-cheng, (born 1952), Taiwanese singer and actor
- Jun Liu, Malaysian choreographer
- Liu Xijun, (born 1988), Chinese pop singer
- Liu Liyang, (born 1982), Chinese singer, DJ, producer and actress.
- Rene Liu, (born 1970), Taiwanese singer-songwriter, actress, director and writer
- Liu Fang, (born 1974), Chinese–Canadian musician and one of the most prominent pipa players in the world.
- Liu Chia-chang, (1940 or 1943–2024), Taiwanese songwriter, singer, screenwriter
- Liu Yuan (musician), (born 1960), one of the two prominent jazz musicians in China
- Liu Liangmo, (1909–1988), musician and Chinese Christian leader
- Liu Zhuang (musician), (1932–2011), musician
- Ji Liu (pianist), (born 1990), Chinese concert pianist
- Liu Sola, singer, composer, and writer
- Liu Huan (born 1963), Chinese singer-songwriter
- Liu Yang (violinist), winner of China's 5th National Violin Competition
- Bruce Liu (pianist), Canadian pianist

== Politicians ==
- Liu Wenhui, warlord and PRC politician
- Liu Yunshan, PRC politician
- Liu Yandong, PRC politician
- Liu Shaoqi, PRC politician, former Chinese President
- Liu Chao-shiuan, Kuomintang politician
- Liu Chien-sin, Deputy Secretary General to the President of the Republic of China
- Liu Chih-kung, Deputy Secretary-General of National Security Council of the Republic of China (2010–2012)
- Liu Pang-yu, Taiwanese politician, Magistrate of Taoyuan County
- Liu Chih-yun, Deputy International Commissioner of the Boy Scouts of China
- Liu Ching-chung, Minister of Hakka Affairs Council (2014–2016)
- Liu Cheng-hung, Magistrate of Miaoli County (2005–2014)
- Liu Cheng-ying, Magistrate of Lienchiang County
- Liu I-chou, Chairperson of Central Election Commission of the Republic of China (2015–2017)
- Liu Kuo-chuan, former Deputy Minister of Veterans Affairs Commission of the Republic of China
- Liu Yuh-san, Secretary-General of the Executive Yuan of the Republic of China (2005–2007)
- Liu Huaqing (1916–2011), PRC politician
- Liu Yu-you, Magistrate of Nantou County (1973–1981)
- Laurin Liu (born 1990), Canadian politician
- José María Liu, Taiwan representative to Spain
- Liu He (politician), (born 1952), Chinese economist and politician
- Eric Liu, (born 1968), American writer, former Deputy Assistant for the United States Domestic Policy Council
- Liu Fuzhi, PRC politician
- Liu Bocheng, PRC military commander
- Carol Liu (born 1941), American politician
- John Liu, American politician in NYC
- Lauren Liu, Canadian politician, the youngest female Member of Parliament in Canadian history
- Liu Ning, Chinese politician, as Communist Party Secretary of Guangxi 2021
- Ted Lieu, United States Congressman from California.
- Law Hieng Ding, Malaysian politician
- Liew Chin Tong, Malaysian politician
- Liew Vui Keong, Malaysian politician
- Christina Liew, Malaysian politician
- Robert Lau, Malaysian politician

== Religion ==
- Ebit Lew, Malaysian Islamic preacher

== Sports ==
=== Basketball ===
- Liu Zhixuan, Chinese basketball player
- Liu Chuanxing, Chinese basketball player for Australia's Brisbane Bullets
- Liu Xiaoyu (basketball), Chinese basketball player
- Liu Wei (basketball), (born 1980) Chinese basketball player

=== Tennis ===
- Amber Liu (tennis), American former professional tennis player
- Liu Nannan, Chinese tennis player
- Liu Weijuan, Chinese tennis player
- Liu Shuhua, Chinese tennis player
- Liu Yanni, Chinese tennis player
- Liu Shaozhuo, Chinese tennis player
- Liu Fangzhou, (born 1995), Chinese tennis player
- Liu Wanting, Chinese tennis player
- Liu Siyu, Chinese tennis player
- Claire Liu, American tennis player
- Liu Chang (tennis), Chinese tennis player

=== Volleyball ===
- Liu Yanhan, Chinese volleyball player
- Liu Dan (volleyball), volleyball player
- Liu Changcheng (volleyball), Chinese volleyball player
- Liu Libin, Chinese volleyball player
- Liu Lijuan (sitting volleyball), Chinese Paralympic sitting volleyball
- Liu Xiaotong, (born 1990), Chinese volleyball player

=== Figure skating ===
- Chaochih Liu, (born 1993), Taiwanese-American figure skater
- Liu Yan (figure skater), (born 1984), former competitive figure skater
- Alysa Liu, figure skater, 2025 world champion, 2026 olympic champion
- Anthony Liu, figure skater
- Shaolin Sándor Liu, Chinese-Hungarian short track speed skater

=== Table tennis ===
- Liu Shiwen, (born 1991), Chinese table tennis player, five-time World Cup champion
- Liu Jia, Chinese Austrian table tennis player
- Juan Liu, American table tennis player
- Na Liu, British table tennis player
- Liu Jing (table tennis), (born 1988), Chinese para table tennis player
- Liu Guoliang, table tennis player

=== Swimming ===
- Liu Jing (swimmer), Chinese swimmer
- Liu Xiang (swimmer), (born 1996) Chinese competitive swimmer
- Liu Daomin, Chinese Paralympic swimmer
- Liu Yaxin, Chinese competitive swimmer
- Liu Zige, Chinese world record holding swimmer
- Liu Ou, Chinese synchronized swimmer
- Liu Limin, Chinese butterfly stroke swimmer
- Liu Benying, Chinese Paralympic swimmer gold medalist
- Liu Yu (para swimmer), Chinese paralympic gold medalist
- Liu Xiaohan, Chinese freestyle swimmer
- Liu Yuntao, Chinese Paralympic swimmer
- Liu Lan, Chinese swimmer
- Liu Fengqi, Chinese Paralympic swimmer

=== Badminton ===
- Lius Pongoh (born 1960), Indonesian badminton player
- Lidya Djaelawijaya (born 1974), Indonesian badminton player
- Liu Kwok Wa (born 1978), Hongkonger badminton player
- Liew Daren (born 1987), Malaysian badminton player and coach
- Liu Xin (badminton), (born 1990), Chinese professional badminton singles player
- Liu Yuchen (born 1995), Chinese badminton player
- Liu Haichao (born 1998), Chinese badminton player
- Liu Shengshu (born 2004), Chinese badminton player

=== Football ===
- Liu Yue (footballer, born 1997), Chinese footballer
- Liu Yue (footballer, born 1975), Chinese footballer
- Liu Ji (footballer), (born 1990), Chinese football player

=== Other sports ===
- Liu Zhongqing, (born 1985), Chinese aerial skier
- Liu Xiang, hurdler, Olympic winner and world record holder
- Isaac Liu, (born 1991), New Zealand Rugby League player
- Liu Yunpeng, Chinese high jumper
- Liu Xin (cyclist), (born 1986), Chinese road bicycle racer
- Liu Jiayu, Chinese snowboarder
- Liu Jinru (born 2000), Chinese artistic gymnast
- Liu Ping (water polo), (born 1987), Chinese water polo player
- "Toyz" Lau Wai-kin, (born 1992), Hong Kong retired professional esports player and the winner of League of Legends: Season 2 World Championship as part of Taipei Assassins
- Liu Dezhu (born 2000), Chinese middle-distance runner
- Liu Junxi (born 2003), Chinese hurdler

== Writers ==
- Cixin Liu (simplified Chinese: 刘慈欣; traditional Chinese: 劉慈欣; pinyin: Liú Cíxīn; born 1963) Chinese science fiction author
- Liu Xiaobo, PRC dissident and Nobel Peace Prize laureate
- Liu Dejun, PRC dissident and activist
- Evelyn Lau, writer
- Lauw Giok Lan, Indonesian writer and journalist, founder of Sin Po
- Junus Jahja. Indonesian writer
- Ken Liu, Chinese-American author
- Henry Liu, (1932–1984), Taiwanese-American writer and journalist
- Liu Yu (political scientist), Chinese author and associate professor of political science at Tsinghua University
- Timothy Liu, (born 1965), American poet
- Marjorie Liu, American author and comic book writer
- Liu Xinwu, (born 1942), Chinese author
- Liu Zaifu (1941–2026), Chinese writer, poet, literary theorist and academic

== Sciences ==
- Huan Liu, Chinese-born computer scientist
- Bin Liu, Singapore chemist, Royal Society of Chemistry Centenary Prize winner.
- Bing Liu (scientist), Chinese-born American scientist and coronavirus researcher
- Liu Gaolian, Chinese scientist
- Charles Liu, Chinese astronomer
- Jiaying Liu (Chinese: 刘家瑛), Chinese computer vision researcher
- Yunhao Liu, (born 1971), Chinese computer scientist
- Margaret A. Liu, (born 1956), physician and researcher
- Jane Liu, Chinese-American computer scientist
- Edison Liu, former president of Human Genome Organization
- Liu Chen (physicist), (born 1946), is an American theoretical physicist
- Yayuan Liu, Chinese-American Materials scientist at MIT
- Liu Gang, Chinese scientist and revolutionary
- Christine Liu, American artist and neuroscientist
- Chung Laung Liu, Taiwanese computer scientist
- Liu Weining, Russian aerospace engineer and businessperson
- Zhiming Liu (computer scientist), Chinese computer scientist
- Liu Yunbin, Chinese nuclear chemist
- Liu Yan (scientist), Chinese Antarctic researcher
- Liu Xin (food scientist), (born 1957)
- Yang Liu (speech recognition) (Chinese: 刘扬), researcher for Amazon Alexa
- Shixia Liu (刘世霞, born 1974), a Chinese computer scientist

== Miscellaneous ==
- Liu Yang (astronaut) (born 1978), Chinese astronaut, a crew member of Shenzhou 9, becoming the first Chinese woman in space
- Finn Lau (born 1993), Hong Kong political activist
- Dan Liu, Hong Kongese fashion designer and founder of TATSUAKI fashion label
- J. J. Liu, professional poker player
- Gordon J. Lau (1941–1998), Chinese American LGBT activist
- Kei May Lau, Hong Kong engineer
- Liu Hong Mei (1982–2005), Chinese murder victim killed in Singapore
- Lau Lee Peng (1952–2000), Singaporean convicted killer and former fishmonger
- Wenjian Liu NYPD officer killed by Ismaaiyl Abdullah Brinsley
- Susanna Lau (born 1983), British fashion blogger
- Liu Xin (news anchor) (born 1975), host and journalist for CGTN
- Liu Yalou, general
- Yan Liu (geographer), Australian geographer
- Tai-Ping Liu (born 1945), Taiwanese mathematician
- Sidney Lau, Hong Kong linguist
- Liu Kwang-ching, historian of China
- Jing Liu (architect) (born 1980), architect and co-founder of SO-IL
- Goodwin Liu, American lawyer and Associate Justice
- Henry Liu (civil engineer), former President of EcologicTech
- Low Hwee Geok, also known as Michelle Low, Singaporean murder victim and former staff member of ITE College Central
- Liu Zhaohua, drug lord executed for making Methamphetamine
- Liu Huanrong, Taiwanese hitman who killed multiple crime bosses
- Liu Wei, Chinese video game developer and CEO, director and founder of company MiHoYo
- Liu Yudi (1923–2015), Chinese flying ace
- Liu Chi-Sheng (1914–1991), Chinese flying ace
- Liu Mengying (1912–1932), murder victim
- Liu Thai Ker (1938–2026), Singaporean architect and urban planner

== Fictional characters ==
- Liu Tang, fictional character in Water Margin
- Liu Kang, fictional character in Mortal Kombat
