= Liu Yan =

Liu Yan may refer to:

- Liu Yan (Xin dynasty) (died 23 AD), rebel leader against the Xin dynasty
- Liu Yan (Han dynasty warlord) (died 194), Eastern Han nobleman and warlord
- Liu Yan (Shu Han) (died 234), general of Shu Han during the Three Kingdoms period
- Liu Yan (Jin dynasty), Jin dynasty official
- Liu Yan (Tang dynasty) (715/716–780), Tang dynasty chancellor
- Liu Yan (emperor) (889–942), founding emperor of Southern Han during the Five Dynasties and Ten Kingdoms period
- Liu Yan (Later Zhou dynasty) (died 953), Five Dynasties politician of the Later Zhou during the Five Dynasties and Ten Kingdoms period
- Liu Yan (actress) (born 1980), Chinese actress, hostess and singer
- Liu Yan (dancer) (born 1982), Chinese dancer
- Liu Yan (figure skater) (born 1984), Chinese figure skater
- Liu Yan (scientist) (fl. 2000s–2010s), Antarctic researcher
- Yan Liu (computer scientist), Chinese and American computer scientist
- Yan Liu (geographer) (fl. 2000s), Australian researcher
- Liu Yan (golfer) (born 1998), Chinese professional golfer
- Liu Yan (chess player) (born 2000), Chinese chess grandmaster
