= Liu Xin =

Liu Xin or Xin Liu is the name of:

- Liu Xin (scholar) (劉歆; c. 50 BCE – 23 CE), astronomer, historian, librarian, mathematician, politician and Confucian scholar of the Han dynasty
- Emperor Ai of Han (27–1 BC), personal name Liu Xin (劉欣), emperor of the Han dynasty
- Liu Xin (food scientist) (劉昕; born 1957), Chinese biologist and food scientist
- Liu Xin (news anchor) (刘欣; born 1975), Chinese news anchor for the state-run CCTV
- Liu Xin (cyclist) (劉馨; born 1986), Chinese road cyclist
- Liu Xin (badminton) (劉鑫; born 1990), Chinese badminton player
- Liu Xin (People's Liberation Army) (刘欣), People's Liberation Army member of the 11th National People's Congress
- Liu Xin (gymnast), Chinese rhythmic gymnast
- Liu Xin (film director) (born 1968), Chinese film director
- Xin Liu (computer scientist), Chinese-American computer scientist at UC Davis
- Xin Liu (philanthropist), Chinese-American philanthropist, author, and former photojournalist

== See also ==
- Liu Hsin (crater), a crater on Mars, named after the Han dynasty scholar
- Liuxin (柳新), a town in Xuzhou, Jiangsu, China
- Liu Xing (born 1984), Chinese Go player
- Liu Yuxin (singer), Chinese singer, dancer and producer
- Xin Lu, Chinese UK-based cancer researcher
