= Lady Hu (Shu Han) =

Wife of Chinese Shu Han official Liu Yan

Lady Hu 胡氏
- Occupation: Aristocrat
- Era: Later Han dynasty Three Kingdoms period
- Spouse: Liu Yan

Lady Hu (胡氏; fl.220-234) was a Chinese woman of the Shu Han state during the Three Kingdoms period (220-280 AD). She was the wife of Liu Yan, a Shu Han general. When her alcoholic husband offered her to be assaulted by the servants, she protested to the court, which led to his execution.

== Marriage to Liu Yan ==
Little is known of Lady Hu as a person, where she was born, her background, her personality, only that she was described as a very beautiful woman. Her husband Liu Yan was handsome and skilled in debate which, along with his imperial lineage, made him a favoured figure. Liu Yan however struggled with drink, was of limited ability, extravagant and had something of an ego. Liu Yan rowed with a senior general Wei Yan and Zhuge Liang, the Chancellor of Shu-Han, removed Liu Yan from office. After a written apology blaming drink, which he vowed to stop, Liu Yan was restored to his former ranks but sent to the capital Chengdu but with his position now token, he returned to drink and may have not been mentally well.

== Divorce, assault and protest ==
For the New Year of 234, Lady Hu entered the palace of Shu Han in Chengdu to pay her respects to Empress Dowager Wu, Liu Bei's widow. For reasons unknown, the empress dowager ordered Lady Hu to remain in the palace. Lady Hu returned home after living in the palace for about a month.

As Lady Hu had a beautiful appearance, Liu Yan suspected that she had a secret affair with the emperor Liu Shan during the month where she stayed in the palace. He ordered 500 of his soldiers to beat her up, slapped her in the face with a shoe, and then divorced her and expelled her from his home.

Lady Hu reported Liu Yan to the authorities for his abusive behaviour. As a result, Liu Yan was arrested and thrown into prison. The investigative officer commented on the incident as follows: “Soldiers aren't meant to help someone beat up his wife. Shoes aren't meant to be used to hit someone in the face.” Liu Yan was publicly executed. After this embarrassing and considerable scandal, the Shu Han government put an end to the practice of allowing officials' wives and mothers to enter the palace at time of celebrations. What happened to Lady Hu after this is not known.

== In fiction ==
In the 14th century historical novel, Romance of the Three Kingdoms by Luo Guanzhong, which romanticizes previous events and during the Three Kingdoms period of China, introduces Lady Hu in Chapter 115, which deals with the incident with Liu Yan. The event points toward Liu Shan becoming more and more obscene therefore losing the trust of talented men while promoting the corrupted. The account is recorded as such :

“In Chengdu the Second Emperor, having fallen under the influence of the eunuch official Huang Hao, indulged in vice and luxury and neglected the business of the court. Lady Hu, wife of the high court official Liu Yan, was an exceptional beauty. On one occasion she entered the court to pay her respects to the Empress, who kept her in the palace for a full month. Afterward, Liu Yan, suspecting that his wife had become intimate with the Second Emperor, arrayed five hundred of his guard before him. At Liu Yan's order, the soldiers tied up Lady Hu and struck her in the face several dozen times with a shoe. The woman fainted and nearly died, but then revived. The Second Emperor was furious when he learned of this incident and ordered an executive officer to condemn Liu Yan. The accusation read: "A common soldier is not the one to strike a wife; the face is not the place to receive punishment; Liu Yan deserves to be executed publicly." Consequently, Liu Yan was beheaded.“

“Thereafter ladies with titles conferred by the sovereign were banned from court. But court officials continued to view the Emperor as given to lust, and many resented and mistrusted him. As a result, worthy and able men began gradually to withdraw, while opportunists advanced steadily.“

In Cai Dongfan's Romance of the Later Han (后汉演义), the events leading to Liu Yan's death were cited as part of Liu Shan's misrule of Shu; Liu's and Hu's surnames were changed to "Hu" (胡) and "He" (贺) respectively.

== Sources ==
- Chen, Shou (3rd century). Records of the Three Kingdoms (Sanguozhi).
- de Crespigny, Rafe (2007). A Biographical Dictionary of Later Han to the Three Kingdoms 23-220 AD. Leiden: Brill. ISBN 9789004156050.
