= Xie Fei (revolutionary) =

Chinese politician, wife of Liu Shaoqi

- 谢飞
- Born: February 3, 1913; Wenchang, Hainan, China
- Died: February 14, 2013 (aged 100); Beijing, China
- Occupation: Politician
- Political party: Chinese Communist Party
- Spouse: Liu Shaoqi (m. 1935; div. 1940)

Xie Fei (Note: In this Chinese name, the family name is Xie.) (simplified Chinese: 谢飞; traditional Chinese: 謝飛; pinyin: Xiè Fēi; 3 February 1913 – 14 February 2013) was a Chinese revolutionary and politician. She participated in the Long March during the Chinese Civil War and was the third wife of Liu Shaoqi.

== Early life ==
She was born Xie Qiongxiang (Chinese: 謝瓊香) in Wenchang, Hainan Province. She was a revolutionary from the age of 13, and became a member of the Chinese Communist Party in 1927. After exile to Hong Kong and undercover work in Singapore, she returned to China in 1932, where she worked in Fujian Province before going to Ruijin in 1934. In her time in Fujian, on several occasions she boiled and ate sensitive documents to keep them from Kuomintang agents, leading to lifelong stomach problems.

== Chinese Civil War ==
During the Chinese Civil War, Xie was one of thirty women participants of the Long March from 1934 to 1935. In October 1935, she married Liu Shaoqi, who later became Chairman of the People's Republic of China, as his third wife. Their marriage has been described as "brief, mysterious, and apparently childless," and ended in divorce in January 1939. or in 1941.

In 1937, Xie studied at the Central Party School of the Chinese Communist Party in Yan'an and then served as party functionary at various levels.

== Later life ==
After the establishment of the People's Republic of China in 1949, Xie became director of a special course at Renmin University of China and, in 1956, deputy principal of the Central Political and Legal Cadre School. She was sent to work on a pig farm in 1959. During the Cultural Revolution, Xie was imprisoned as a former close associate of Liu Shaoqi; she was rehabilitated in 1978. She became the deputy principal of the People's Public Security University of China and retired in February 2000. She died of illness in Beijing on 14 February 2013, at the age of 100.

== Sources ==
- Cheng, Hongyi; Chang, Xuemei (9 April 2013). "谢飞同志逝世--新闻报道-人民网". People's Daily (in Chinese (China)).
- Dittmer, Lowell (1981). "Death and Transfiguration: Liu Shaoqi's Rehabilitation and Contemporary Chinese Politics". The Journal of Asian Studies. 40 (3): 455–479. doi:10.2307/2054551. ISSN 0021-9118. JSTOR 2054551. S2CID 153995268.
- Dittmer, Lowell (12 February 2015). Liu Shaoqi and the Chinese Cultural Revolution. Routledge. ISBN 978-1-317-46600-0.
- Wiles, Sue (8 July 2016). "Xie Fei". Biographical Dictionary of Chinese Women: v. 2: Twentieth Century. By Lee, Lily Xiao Hong. Routledge. pp. 586–588. ISBN 978-1-315-49924-6.
- Liu, Juntao (9 April 2013). "谢飞同志逝世". world.people.com.cn (in Chinese (China)).
- Young, Helen Praeger (2001). Choosing Revolution: Chinese Women Soldiers on the Long March. University of Illinois Press. ISBN 978-0-252-02672-0. JSTOR 10.5406/j.ctt2ttbrr.
