= Liu Weining =

Russian aerospace engineer and businessperson

- 刘维宁
- Born: 1955 (age 70–71); Moscow, Russian SFSR, Soviet Union
- Other names: Alexei Klimovich Fedotov; Alyosha
- Occupations: Aerospace engineer; businessman
- Children: 2
- Father: Liu Yunbin
- Relatives: Liu Shaoqi (grandfather)

Alexei Klimovich Fedotov (Russian: Алексей Климович Федотов; born 1955), also known by his Chinese name Liu Weining (Chinese: 刘维宁; pinyin: Liú Wéiníng), is a Russian aerospace engineer and businessman. He is the son of nuclear chemist Liu Yunbin and grandson of former president of the People's Republic of China Liu Shaoqi.

== Early life ==
Alexei was born on 1955 in Moscow to Liu Yunbin, also known by his Russian name 'Klim' (Клим), and his Russian wife Mara Fedotova. At the time of his birth, Alexei's father was a graduate student in radiochemistry at Moscow State University. His paternal grandfather was Liu Shaoqi, the second president of the People's Republic of China.

In 1957, following a request by Liu Shaoqi, Liu Yunbin returned to China to work in the Chinese nuclear weapons program. Following his father, Alexei, his sister and his mother arrived in China in 1959, which would be the last time he would see his father. Due to the tensions between China and Soviet Union, Mara divorced Liu and returned to the Soviet Union with Alexei and his sister.

In 1960, Alexei met his grandfather Liu Shaoqi during Liu's visit to the Soviet Union, which would be the only time he would meet his grandfather in person. During the Cultural Revolution, Liu Shaoqi was denounced as a "capitalist roader" and "traitor", and was removed from his position, which resulted in Liu Yunbin being condemned as a "spy" and "capitalist roader". Liu Yunbin was also abused by the Red Guards and committed suicide on 21 November 1967 while Liu Shaoqi died on 12 November 1969 due in part to maltreatment and torture in custody.

== Career ==
During his life in the Soviet Union, Alexei never publicly disclosed himself as grandson of Liu Shaoqi. Also, while he was in high school and at his workplace, he kept the information to himself due to the fear of being spied on by the KGB, when Sino-Soviet relations further deteriorated. After graduating from Moscow Aviation Institute, he worked with the Soviet State Space Command Center and later the Russian State Space Command Center, and became a senior engineer.

In 1998, at the request of Liu Shaoqi's wife Wang Guangmei, he was invited by the Government of China to attend the celebrations of the 100th birth anniversary of Liu Shaoqi. However, because his occupation involved military secrecy, his request to travel to China was denied. By the time he received approval to travel to China following a long delay in waiting for instructions from the military administration and the Federal Security Service, the celebrations of Liu Shaoqi's 100th birth anniversary had already ended.

In the aftermath, Alexei applied for early retirement but his superiors did not approve it. He later appealed to the court and won the case, then retired in 1998. Because his work involved state secrets, according to regulations he could only go abroad five years after retiring. Thus, five years later, in 2003, Alexei went to China for the first time and was welcomed by Wang Guangmei and Liu Shaoqi's living relatives. He then visited Liu Shaoqi's birthplace at Huaminglou town in Ningxiang, Hunan.

Since then, he has visited China multiple times and a few years later, he obtained a permanent residence permit for foreigners and settled in Panyu District in Guangzhou. Presently, he manages a non-commercial organization in Guangzhou that facilitates trade between China and Russia.

== Personal life ==
Alexei and his wife have a son and daughter. His daughter serves as the vice chairman of the Russian-Asian Industrial Entrepreneurs Association and Russia-Philippine Business Council.
