= Battle of Kunyang =

Battle between Wang Mang and Liu Xiu in 23 AD

Coordinates: 33°37′37″N 113°21′25″E

- Part of the Lulin Rebellion
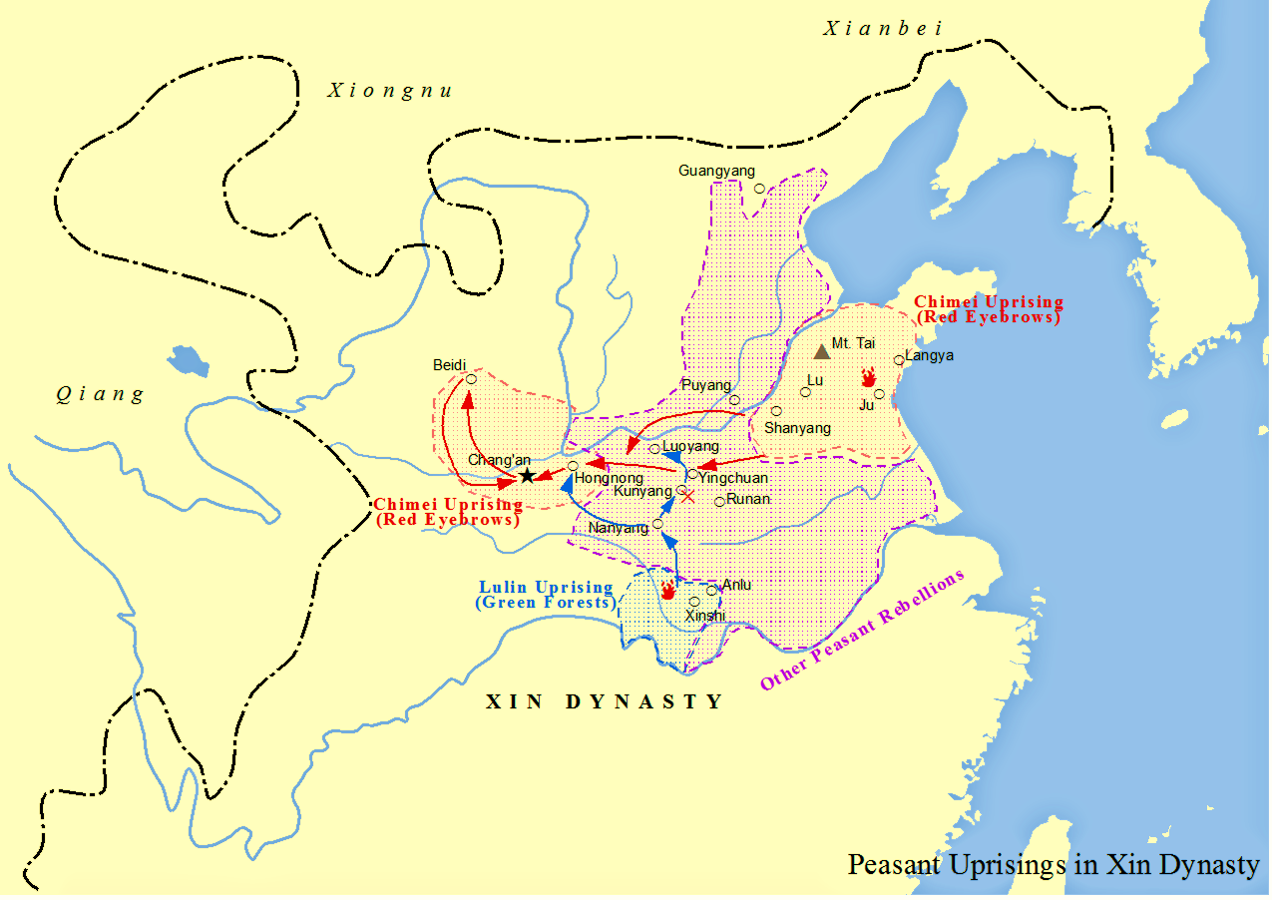
- Location of Battle of Kunyang and major uprisings in Xin dynasty
Date	June to July 23 AD
Location	Kunyang, Henan
Result	Lulin victory: Fall of the Xin dynasty
Territorial changes	Xin dynasty annexed by Lulin

Belligerents
Xin dynasty	Lulin

Commanders and leaders
Wang Yi; Wang Xun †	Liu Xiu; Wang Feng; Wang Chang

Strength
430,000 (According to Book of Han); 50,000~60,000 (According to Dongguan Hanji (東觀漢記)); 30,000 (According to Lunheng)	~10,000

Casualties and losses
Heavy	Minimal

The Battle of Kunyang (Chinese: 昆陽之戰) was fought during June and July in 23 AD, between the Lulin and Xin dynasty forces. The Lulin forces were led by Liu Xiu, who later became Emperor Guangwu of Han, while the far more numerous Xin were led by Wang Yi and Wang Xun (王尋). Wang Xun was killed during a foolhardy attack on Liu's force with a small contingent of his force, and the Lulin forces disrupted the remainder of the Xin army, forcing Wang Yi to retreat. This was the decisive battle that led to the fall of the Xin dynasty.

== Background ==
By the end of the Xin dynasty, peasants all over the country rebelled against Xin Emperor Wang Mang in response to what they saw as years of incompetent rule. Calls for the re-establishment of the Han dynasty, which Wang Mang overthrew, were on the rise. Heeding these voices, the leaders of the Lulin rebellions supported Liu Xuan to be the emperor of the new Han dynasty.

Wang Mang decided that he had to crush the newly constituted Han regime before it gained momentum, and sent his cousin Wang Yi and his prime minister Wang Xun, with what he considered to be an overwhelming force of several hundred thousand men, to attack the Lulin forces. The Lulin forces were split in two — one force was led by Wang Feng, Wang Chang and Liu Xiu, while the other force was led by Liu Yan. Wang Feng, Wang Chang, and Liu Xiu soon took the castles of Kunyang (昆陽), Dingling (定陵), and Yanxian (郾縣). Liu Xiu's forces had started attacking Yangguan (陽關), but after hearing of the arrival of the main Xin forces, he decided to retreat to Kunyang. The 9,000 rebels in Kunyang, vastly outnumbered by the Xin force, initially wanted to scatter and retreat to Jingzhou, but Liu Xiu opposed this idea. He advocated that they guard Kunyang securely, since a scattered army would be easy prey. Liu Xiu promised to gather all available troops in the area and attack the Xin forces from behind. After initially rejecting Liu Xiu's idea, the rebels eventually agreed.

== Battle ==
With the Xin forces approaching Kunyang from the north, Liu Xiu led 13 horsemen out of Kunyang at night to find reinforcements from Dingling and Yanxian.

The Xin commander, Wang Yi, confident of his overwhelming numbers, stated that his army would "annihilate all in his path, massacre the town, and dance in its blood", and laid siege to the town. Faced with siege towers and tunnels dug under its castle walls, Kunyang's defences held on until Liu Xiu returned with 10,000 foot soldiers and cavalry on 7 July. By then, the Xin forces' morale was dropping while the Lulin forces' morale increased with Liu's return. Liu Xiu took this chance to lead 1,000 men to engage the Xin forces, while another brigade of 3,000 marched around to the rear of the Xin army and attacked the Xin's main camp.

Wang Yi, still underestimating the Lulin forces, led 10,000 men with Wang Xun to meet the enemy, while ordering the rest of his troops to stand their ground unless he ordered them to attack. Once they engaged in battle, however, after minor losses, the other units were hesitant to assist them, and Liu Xiu killed Wang Xun in battle. Once that happened, the Lulin forces inside Kunyang burst out of the city and attacked the other Xin units, and the much larger Xin forces suffered a total collapse. Adding to the misery of the Xin forces was a sudden rainstorm which caused a flash flood, drowning many of the fleeing men.

== Aftermath ==
Unable to gather most of his men, Wang Yi had to withdraw with his remaining several thousand men back to Luoyang. Once the news about the outcome of the Battle of Kunyang spread throughout the empire, the people rose across the empire, with many killing local government officials while others claimed to be officials under the new Han regime. Within a month, most of the empire had slipped out of Xin control.
