= Liu Dejun =

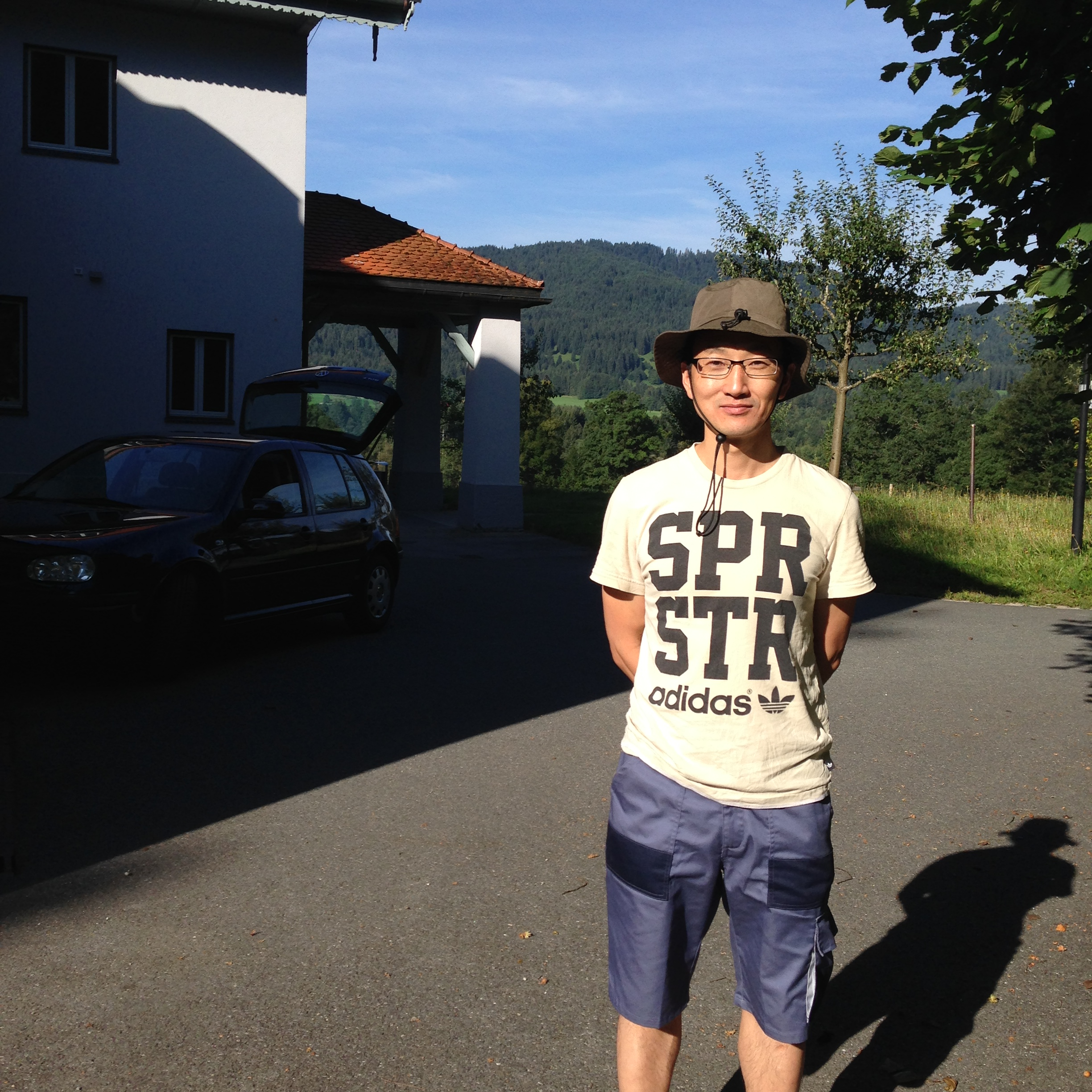

Liu Dejun (Chinese: 刘德军) is an activist and dissident in the People's Republic of China. His work has focused on the Chinese democracy and human rights movements. Liu is now a scholar of the program Writers in Exile in Germany and living in Nuremberg and the President of the non-profit association "Human Rights for China". He's involved in a large number of human rights cases and reported these cases on the website Boxun, and his Twitter, Facebook, and blogs, but all of his blogs in China were deleted by the Chinese authorities. Now he has created a new blog which is based in Germany.

Because of his activities, Liu was arrested many times. On December 28, 2008, he was arrested and tortured by Guangdong police, because he sent out flyers of democracy with Li Tie, Yang Yong and other activists. In 2010, when he was investigating the case of Qian Yunhui, he was arrested twice by around 20 heavily armed policemen from Huang Wei's home. In 2010, because of supporting Chinese activist Ni Yulan, Liu was arrest and tortured by Beijing security service in middle of the night and was thrown in the mountains in the countryside of Beijing. The artist Ai Weiwei made a documentary about these events.

On February 27, 2011, Liu was kidnapped by the security service of Chinese central government in Beijing and brought in to four secret trial bases. His clothes were forced to be taken off, he was punched many times, shocked with an electric baton, deprived of food, and deprived of blankets at nights.

In 2013, Liu came to Brussels and then Ireland with the help of Frontlinedefenders, one Human Rights organisation. After three months, Liu got the scholarship of Writer in Exile, then he has been living in Nuremberg and works still for Democracy and Human Rights for China.

In August 2015, Liu established a NGO "Human Rights for China" with friends in Nuremberg.

Liu is now studying German law in Friedrich-Alexander University Erlangen-Nürnberg, in order to establish a legal system in China in the future.

Liu is a member of the Amnesty International University Group Erlangen and founded a sub-group called China-Work-Team.
