= Liu Yan (Shu Han) =

Shu Han general and official (died 234)

- 劉琰

General of Chariots and Cavalry (車騎將軍)
- In office 230 – 234
- Monarch: Liu Shan
- Chancellor: Zhuge Liang

Minister of the Guards (衛尉)
- In office 223 – ?
- Monarch: Liu Shan
- Chancellor: Zhuge Liang

Central Military Adviser (中軍師)
- In office 223 – ?
- Monarch: Liu Shan
- Chancellor: Zhuge Liang

General of the Rear (後將軍)
- In office 223 – ?
- Monarch: Liu Shan
- Chancellor: Zhuge Liang

Administrator of Guling (固陵太守)
- In office 214 – 223
- Monarch: Liu Bei
- Chancellor: Zhuge Liang

Personal details
- Born: Unknown Qufu, Shandong
- Died: c. April 234 Chengdu, Sichuan
- Spouse: Lady Hu
- Occupation: General
- Courtesy name: Weishuo (威碩)
- Peerage: Marquis of a Chief District (都鄉侯)

Liu Yan (died c.April 234), courtesy name Weishuo, was a long serving official in the state of Shu Han during the Three Kingdoms of China having served under the much travelled warlord Liu Bei during the late Eastern Han dynasty. Handsome and well spoken, he achieved high rank and favour but there were questions about his abilities, with his rank more honorary than powerful in practice, and he had a drinking problem. Nearly sacked after a fall out with Wei Yan, accusations about his wife Lady Hu and the Emperor saw him executed in disgrace.

== Early career under Liu Bei ==
Liu Yan was born during the late Eastern Han dynasty in the Lu State (魯國), a princedom around present-day Qufu, Shandong. When the warlord Liu Bei was the nominal inspector of Yu Province during the early 190s under Tao Qian, he met Liu Yan and recruited him as an assistant officer (從事). A charming, handsome and eloquent man, skilled in debate with ties to the imperial clan, Liu Yan became a personal favourite of Liu Bei's and accompanied the warlord across the land.

In 214, after Liu Bei seized control of Yi Province (covering present-day Sichuan and Chongqing) from the warlord Liu Zhang, he appointed Liu Yan as the Administrator of Guling Commandery (固陵郡; a.k.a. Badong Commandery 巴東郡; covering parts of present-day Chongqing).

== Service under Liu Shan ==
In 223, after Liu Bei's son and successor Liu Shan became emperor of Shu Han, he enfeoffed Liu Yan as a Marquis of a Chief District (都鄉侯) and accorded him honours and privileges second to those accorded to Li Yan. He also appointed Liu Yan as Minister of the Guards (衛尉), Central Military Adviser (中軍師), and General of the Rear (後將軍). Liu Yan was later promoted to the position of General of Chariots and Cavalry (車騎將軍).

Despite holding important ranks, Liu Yan was not actively involved in state and military affairs while showing little aptitude for it. With only a thousand troops under his command, the Chancellor Zhuge Liang derided him as a spectating commentator. Outside the workplace, he led an extravagant and pretentious lifestyle. He also had dozens of maids to attend to him; many of them could also sing and play music. He even taught them to recite the "Lu Ling Guang Dian Fu" (魯靈光殿賦), a rhapsody by Wang Yanshou.

In 232, Liu Yan got into a quarrel with the Shu Han general Wei Yan and made baseless accusations against him. After Zhuge Liang stripped Liu Yan of rank, Liu Yan wrote an apology to Zhuge Liang as follows:

"I am naturally inclined towards pretensions and affectations. I have never been mindful of my behaviour. To make things worse, I tend to talk nonsense when I am drunk. Since I started following the Late Emperor, I have said many absurd things that were detrimental to the State's fortunes. I am grateful to you, Sir, for recognising that I am faithful and loyal to the State, for forgiving me for my many flaws, for providing me much support, and allowing me to get to the high position that I am in today. I got addicted to alcohol and failed to watch my tongue. You are kind and generous enough to forgive me for my transgression and not pursue the matter, thus allowing me to preserve my life. I will definitely perform my duties more carefully, motivate myself to do better, and correct my mistakes. I swear to the gods that I will do this. If I cannot serve the State with my life, then I will feel so ashamed to continue living."

Zhuge Liang then sent Liu Yan back to Chengdu, the Shu Han capital, and restored him to his former position.

== Downfall and execution ==
Liu Yan was unable to keep his promise to fix his faults and curb drinking, his thinking becoming confused while Rafe De Crespigny muses Liu Yan may have become mentally unwell. In February or March 234, Liu Yan's wife, Lady Hu (胡氏), entered the palace to pay her respects to Empress Dowager Wu. For reasons unknown, the empress dowager ordered Lady Hu to remain in the palace. Lady Hu returned home after living in the palace for a month.

As Lady Hu had a beautiful appearance, Liu Yan suspected that she had a secret affair with the emperor Liu Shan during that one month she stayed in the palace. He ordered 500 of his soldiers to beat her up, slapped her in the face with a shoe, and then divorced her and sent her back to her maiden family.

Lady Hu reported Liu Yan to the authorities for his abusive behaviour. As a result, Liu Yan was arrested and thrown into prison. During this time, an official commented on the incident as follows: "Soldiers aren't meant to help someone beat up his wife. Shoes aren't meant to be used to hit someone in the face." Liu Yan was then executed and his body was abandoned in the streets. After the scandal, the Shu Han government put an end to the practice of allowing officials' wives and mothers to enter the palace at time of celebrations. Chen Shou in the Sanguozhi remarked Liu Yan was valued but brought about his own fall.

== In fiction ==
In Cai Dongfan's Romance of the Later Han (后汉演义), the events leading to Liu Yan's death were cited as part of Liu Shan's misrule of Shu; the surnames of Liu and his wife Lady Hu were changed to "Hu" (胡) and "He" (贺) respectively.

== See also ==
- Lists of people of the Three Kingdoms
