= Ebit Lew =

Malaysian philanthropist (born 1984)

Ebit Lew ايبيت ايراوان بن إبراهيم ليو
- 刘润保
- Born: Lew Yun Pau; 21 December 1984 (age 41); Muadzam Shah, Pahang, Malaysia
- Other name: Ebit Irawan bin Ibrahim Lew
- Citizenship: Malaysian
- Education: Universiti Putra Malaysia
- Occupations: Media personality, entrepreneur

Ebit Irawan bin Ibrahim Lew (born Lew Yun Pau; 21 December 1984), better known as Ebit Lew, is a Malaysian entrepreneur and Islam Missionary (Da'i). He is known for his approach to the poor, the marginalized, the teens, and the LGBTQ+ community. He is also known for his family motivation seminars, the Sunnah Family.

== Early life and education ==
Ebit Lew was born in Muadzam Shah, Pahang on 21 December 1984 under the name Lew Yun Pau. He is the third of 11 children. He converted to Islam at the age of 12 after following closely the religion.

He graduated from Universiti Putra Malaysia. Prior to that, he received his early education at Sekolah Kebangsaan Bukit Ridan, Sekolah Menengah Kebangsaan Muadzam Shah, Pahang, Sekolah Menengah Teknik Johor Bahru and Sekolah Menengah Kebangsaan Abdul Rahman Talib, Pahang.

== Philanthropy ==
Elewsmart by Ebit Lew in Balakong. All Elewsmart outlets were permanently closed from January 2024 due to unprofitability and mismanagement.

Ebit Lew is known for occasionally undergoing large-scale charitable activities. During the new wave COVID-19 pandemic in Malaysia at the end of October 2020, Ebit Lew contributed essential medical equipment for the use of medical officers in Sabah who were severely affected by the wave, delivered by Raya Airlines prebooked. A week later, Ebit Lew also delivered about 10 tonnes of food from Elewsmart to Sabahans.

On 15 November, Ebit Lew sent donations of approximately 200 kilograms of beef and 500 kilogrammes of fruit and vegetables to Zoo Negara affected by corruption which became apparent as a result of the COVID-19 pandemic. His actions resurfaced the financial problems faced by Zoo Negara that has been going on for a long time.

Ebit arrived in Turkey with donations during the 2023 Turkey–Syria earthquake along with the Fire and Rescue Department of Malaysia.

== Controversies ==
Ebit was charged with 11 counts of sexual harassment including insulting the modesty of a woman in her 40s by allegedly sending obscene words and pictures to the victim's phone number via WhatsApp between March and June 2021.
