= Liu Yunbin =

Chinese nuclear chemist (1925–1967)

- 刘允斌
- Liu in the 1950s
- Born: 1925; Anyuan, Pingxiang, Jiangxi, Republic of China
- Died: 21 November 1967 (aged 41–42); Baotou, Inner Mongolia, People's Republic of China
- Occupation: Nuclear chemist
- Spouse(s): Mara Fedotova (div. 1959) Li Miaoxiu
- Children: 4, including Alexei

Liu Yunbin (Chinese: 刘允斌; pinyin: Liú Yǔnbīn) (1925 – 21 November 1967) was a Chinese nuclear chemist and the son of former president of China Liu Shaoqi.

== Early life ==
Liu was born on 1925 in Anyuan District of Pingxiang to Liu Shaoqi and He Baozhen. When he was two years old, he was sent back to Liu Shaoqi's hometown in Ningxiang County, Hunan for foster care. In 1934, his mother was executed while in captivity by the Kuomintang.

In July 1938, the Chinese Communist Party brought Liu to Yan'an to reunite with his father. In the autumn of the same year, at the age of 13, Liu started studying at Yan'an Education Primary School.

== Education and scientific career ==
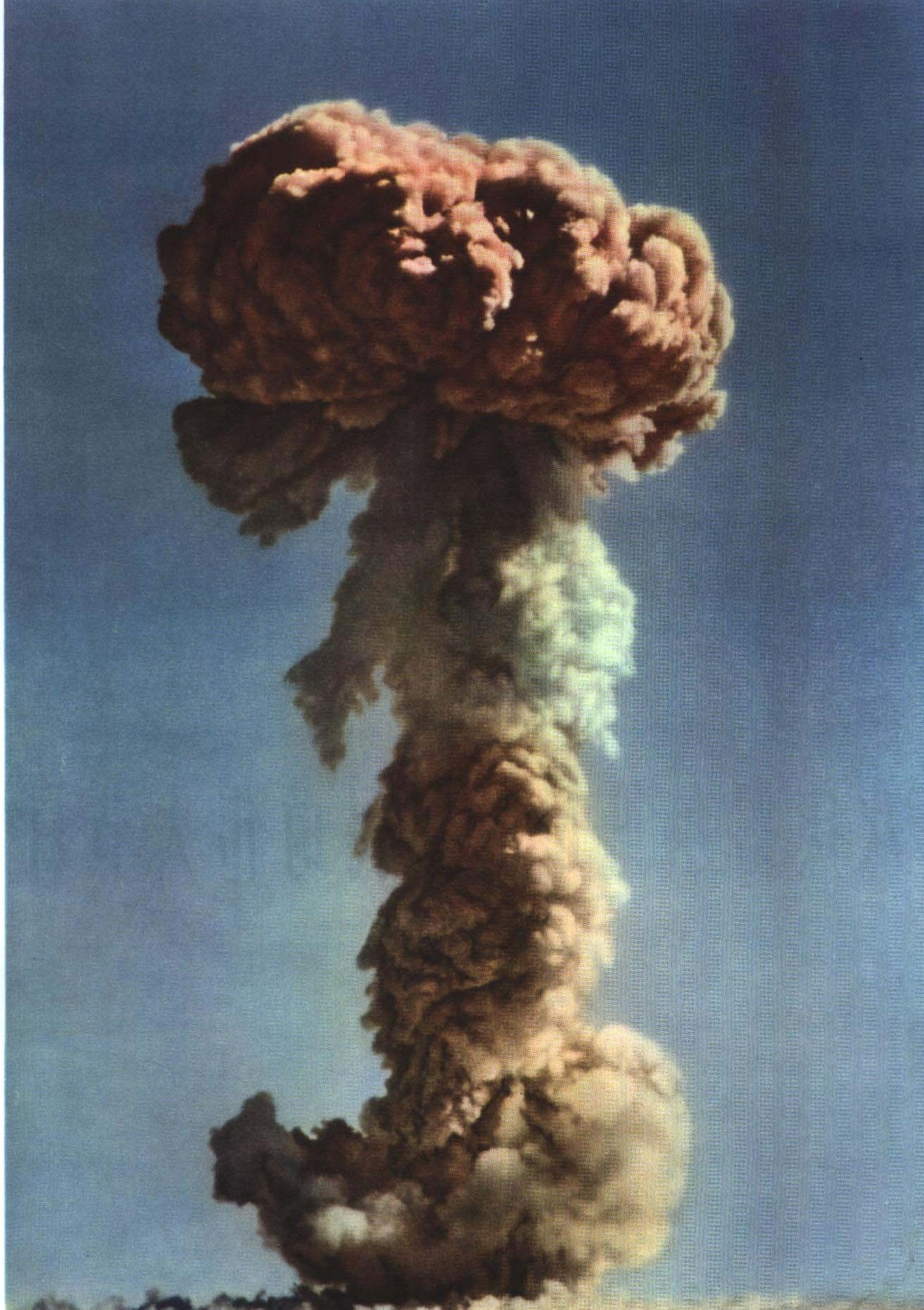
Project 596

In 1939, the Central Committee of the Chinese Communist Party decided to send a group of children of party revolutionaries to study in the Soviet Union. In November 1939 Liu and his sister Liu Aiqin arrived at the children's home in Monino, where Mao Zedong's sons Mao Anying and Mao Anqing were also living. While in Soviet Union, Liu was known by Russian name 'Klim' (Клим).

After one semester of study, Liu Yunbin moved to Interdom, which was 300 kilometers away from Moscow, at the city of Ivanovo, and was sponsored by the International Red Aid of the Soviet Union. During his time at the school, he studied very hard and in June 1941, following the start of the German invasion of the Soviet Union, Liu actively participated in the labors organized by the International Children's Institute, such as land reclamation, logging, and moving firewood. He also took the initiative to donate blood for the Soviet Red Army soldiers fighting in the frontline. He was selected as one of the leaders of the International Children's Institute student union, and soon joined the Komsomol and served as the head of the organization in the International Children's Academy.

After graduation from high school in 1945, Liu was admitted to the Moscow Iron and Steel Institute, where he majored in smelting. During his time in the institution, he also joined the Communist Party of the Soviet Union and after graduation, he was admitted to the Department of Chemistry at Moscow State University with honors and as a graduate student in radiochemistry. He graduated in 1955 with an associate doctorate degree and entered the Moscow University Institute of Chemistry as a senior researcher. In a 1955 letter to Liu Yunbin, Liu Shaoqi stated:

When your personal interest is in conflict with the interest of the Party, I believe you can sacrifice your own interest for the sake of the Party and the country."

In 1957, he returned to China, where he resided in his father's residence in Zhongnanhai for a few days, before moving to Fangshan County, Shanxi, 50 kilometers away from Beijing, to work at the China Institute of Atomic Energy (Institute 401), which was one of the earliest nuclear weapons research institutes in China. He made outstanding contributions to nuclear energy research and was awarded the title of associate researcher.

In 1959, when Sino-Soviet relations deteriorated, the Soviet Union refused to provide China with technical materials required to develop the atomic bomb. In 1961, researchers from the First Institute of the China Institute of Atomic Energy were transferred to the China Nuclear Fuel Component Factory (Factory 202) at Baotou, Inner Mongolia Autonomous Region, where they set up a second laboratory, which was responsible for the research into thermonuclear materials.

In the winter of 1962, Liu Yunbin arrived at the 202 Factory, where he was appointed by his superiors as the director of the Second Research Office. The office under his leadership began research and organizational work for the atomic bomb project and, on 16 October 1964, China's first atomic bomb was successfully detonated at the Lop Nur test site, which resulted in China becoming the fifth nuclear power in the world and the first Asian nation to possess nuclear capability.

== Downfall and death ==
In 1966 the Cultural Revolution began and Liu was sent to work, where he was tasked with cleaning and digging sewage ditches and other unskilled work. In July 1966, Liu Shaoqi was denounced as a "capitalist roader" and "traitor", and was removed from his position as Party Deputy chairman by Lin Biao.

As a consequence of the downfall of his father, Liu Yunbin was also condemned as a "spy" and "capitalist roader". He was beaten and abused by the Red Guards, who took him to an urban area in Baotou, where he was publicly humiliated at a denunciation rally. On 21 November 1967, Liu took his own life by lying on the railroad tracks north of the residential area where his family lived.

Liu's father died on 12 November 1969, in Kaifeng, due in part to maltreatment and torture in custody. Following the end of the Cultural Revolution in 1976 with the death of Mao Zedong, Liu Yunbin was posthumously rehabilitated and his reputation restored in 1978. In the same year, a solemn memorial service was conducted for him at the 202 Factory Club. Liu Shaoqi was posthumously rehabilitated in 1980.

On 16 April 2015, Russian Ambassador to China Andrey Denisov awarded the Jubilee Medal "70 Years of Victory in the Great Patriotic War 1941–1945" to 32 Chinese citizens, including Liu Yunbin, who was posthumously awarded the medal.

== Personal life ==
During his time in the Soviet Union, Liu married a Russian woman named Mara Fedotova. The couple had two children; a son named Alexei (Russian: Алексей Климович Федото, Alexei Klimovich Fedotov; Chinese: 刘维宁, Liu Weining) and a daughter named Sonya.

After Liu returned to China in 1957, Mara also moved to China with the children in 1959, which would be the last time the couple would see each other. Due to the tensions between China and Soviet Union, Mara divorced Liu and returned to Moscow with her two children. Liu later married Li Miaoxiu, with whom he had two sons, Liu Weidong and Liu Weize.

Alexei, who is also known by nickname Alyosha, did not publicly reveal himself as grandson of Liu Shaoqi due to fear of being spied on by the KGB when Sino-Soviet relations further deteriorated. After graduating from Moscow Aviation Institute, he worked at the national aviation space center of the Soviet Union and Roscosmos for a number of years with his identity not known until he was invited by the Government of China to attend the commemoration of the 100th anniversary of Liu Shaoqi's birthday in 1998.

His request to travel to China was rejected as his occupation involved military secrecy. The denial of his request led him to grow anxious to travel to China and therefore to retire from the Russian military early. When his request to travel to China was refused again he filed a lawsuit and in 2003 managed to visit China for the first time, where he met with Liu Shaoqi's living family members, including his wife Wang Guangmei.

He decided to settle in China, where he presently manages an organization called 'Russian-Asian Union of Industrialists and Entrepreneurs' that facilitates trade between China and Russia in Guangzhou. Alexei and his wife have two children, including a daughter named Margarita who is currently serving as the vice chairman of the Russian-Asian Industrial Entrepreneurs Association and Russia-Philippine Business Council.

Liu's daughter Sonya married a Russian American and is currently settled in the United States.
