= Yang Liu (speech recognition) =

Chinese-American computer scientist

- Education: Tsinghua University (M.S. and B.S. in electrical engineering) Purdue University (PhD in electrical and computer engineering)
- Known for: Natural language processing; Speech processing
- Awards: NSF CAREER Award (2009); Air Force Young Investigator Program Award (2010); IEEE Fellow (2021); ISCA Fellow (2021)
- Scientific career
- Fields: Computer science
- Workplaces: Amazon; Facebook; Google; University of Texas at Dallas; International Computer Science Institute
- Thesis: Structural event detection for rich transcription of speech

Yang Liu (Chinese: 刘扬) is a Chinese and American computer scientist specializing in speech processing and natural language processing, and a senior principal scientist for Amazon.

== Education ==
Yang Liu obtained her bachelor's and master's degrees in electrical engineering from Tsinghua University in 1997 and 2000, respectively. She earned her Ph.D. in electrical and computer engineering from Purdue University in 2004. Her dissertation was titled "Structural event detection for rich transcription of speech," focusing on the automatic detection of several structural events in speech.

== Career and research ==
After postdoctoral research at the International Computer Science Institute in Berkeley, California, she became an assistant professor of computer science at the University of Texas at Dallas in 2005, and was tenured as an associate professor there in 2011. She moved from academia to Silicon Valley in California in 2015, but retained her faculty position in Dallas on leave until 2018.

Meanwhile, she was a visiting scientist at Google Research from 2015 to 2016, a researcher for Facebook from 2016 to 2017, and head of the AI lab for LAIX Inc. from 2017 to 2019. In 2019, she took her present position at Amazon, as a principal scientist for Alexa AI.

Yang Liu's research spans multiple areas in natural language processing and speech processing. Her work has been published at multiple computer science, computational linguistics, and speech processing conferences. These include the Association for Computational Linguistics, Empirical Methods in Natural Language Processing, the North American Chapter of the Association for Computational Linguistics, and the International Conference on Acoustics, Speech and Signal Processing.

She has held several editorial and committee roles. She served as a senior associate editor for IEEE Transactions on Audio, Speech, and Language Processing, an action editor for Transactions of the Association for Computational Linguistics, and as a member of the IEEE Speech and Language Processing Technical Committee. Additionally, she served as the general chair for ACL 2023.

== Recognition ==
In 2009, Yang Liu received the prestigious NSF CAREER Award by the National Science Foundation. Also, she was also recipient of the Air Force Young Investigator Program Award, 2010, for "computational modeling of emotions and affect in social-cultural interaction".

In 2021, Liu was named an IEEE Fellow "for contributions to speech understanding and language learning technology". In the same year, she was also named a Fellow of the International Speech Communication Association, "for her contributions to speech recognition and understanding, prosody modelling, summarization, sentiment analysis, and social media research".

== Selected publications ==
Liu, Yang; Shriberg, Elizabeth; Stolcke, Andreas; Hillard, Dustin; Ostendorf, Mari; Harper, Mary (September 2006). Enriching speech recognition with automatic detection of sentence boundaries and disfluencies. IEEE Transactions on audio, speech, and language processing. Vol. 14. pp. 1526–1540.

Solorio, Thamar; Liu, Yang (October 2008). Learning to Predict Code-Switching Points. Proceedings of the 2008 Conference on Empirical Methods in Natural Language Processing. Honolulu, Hawaii: Association for Computational Linguistics. pp. 973–981.

Liu, Feifan; Pennell, Deana; Liu, Fei; Liu, Yang (June 2009). Unsupervised Approaches for Automatic Keyword Extraction Using Meeting Transcripts. Proceedings of Human Language Technologies: The 2009 Annual Conference of the North American Chapter of the Association for Computational Linguistics. Boulder, Colorado: Association for Computational Linguistics. pp. 620–628.

Ang, J.; Liu, Yang; Shriberg, Elizabeth (March 2005). Automatic dialog act segmentation and classification in multiparty meetings. Proceedings. (ICASSP '05). IEEE International Conference on Acoustics, Speech, and Signal Processing, 2005. Philadelphia, PA: IEEE. pp. I/1061–I/1064.
