= Christine Liu =

American artist and neuroscientist

- Education: University of Oregon; University of California, Berkeley
- Website: http://www.christineliuart.com

Christine Liu is an American artist and neuroscientist. Her art focuses on science and equity.

== Biography ==
Liu is in a PhD program in neuroscience at the University of California, Berkeley. She received her undergraduate degree at the University of Oregon. Liu's research in neuroscience focuses on nicotine and dopamine. "I’m interested, in general, in understanding how drugs of abuse or recreational drugs act on the brain," Liu said in an interview. She combined her research and art into a zine about nicotine.

Liu advocates for better working conditions for graduate students and more diversity in science. She writes about these topics on social media and in outlets like Quartz. She also founded The STEM Squad, a group for women in science careers.

== Art ==
Liu co-founded Two Photon Art, a science art collective that sells pins, necklaces, and other science-themed accessories. She also illustrated a glossary of biomedical terms for the Innovative Genomics Institute. Her art has appeared in numerous outlets, including Quartz and Berkeley News. Liu is a self-taught artist.
