= Henry Liu (civil engineer) =

Henry Liu (June 3, 1936 – December 1, 2009) was an American civil engineer and the president of Freight Pipeline Company (FPC), now known as EcologicTech.

Liu earned his PhD in civil engineering from Colorado State University with research on fluid mechanics, and then worked as a professor of civil engineering at the University of Missouri (MU) in Columbia, Missouri, for over 20 years. At MU, he was also director of the Capsule Pipeline Research Center, a joint state industry initiative funded by the National Science Foundation to develop Capsule pipeline technology to transport freight- an innovative application of pipelines to transfer solids instead of fluids.

In 2001, after his retirement, Liu founded FPC, the company which developed a new type of Fly Ash Brick, a building brick made from a waste by-product of coal power plants, using an environmentally sustainable manufacturing process.

Liu had spent most of his working career compressing industrial freight using hydraulic presses. In 1999, he was given some fly ash by a client, and decided to compress it "just to see what would come out." Liu mixed the fly ash with water and applied 4,000 psi (28 MPa) of pressure. After two weeks, he found that the mixture had set into blocks with the strength of concrete. Owing to the high concentration of calcium oxide in fly ash, the bricks can be described as "self-cementing".

Liu used a National Science Foundation grant of $600,000 to perfect the manufacturing technique over an eight-year period, discovering that by adding an air entrainment agent which generates microscopic bubbles in the hardened brick that better accommodate the expansion of freezing water, he was able to produce a brick which could withstand over 100 freeze-thaw cycles, thereby comfortably meeting US federal safety standards.

Since the manufacturing method uses a waste by-product rather than clay, and solidification takes place under pressure rather than heat, it offers several environmental benefits. It saves energy, reduces mercury pollution, alleviates the need for landfill disposal of fly ash, and costs 20% less than traditional methods. The bricks are now manufactured under license by Calstar Products in California.

In October 2009, Liu was awarded the $100,000 Purpose Prize award for his fly brick invention however, died on December 1, 2009, in a car accident at age 73.
