= Jiaying Liu =

Chinese computer scientist

Jiaying Liu (Chinese: 刘家瑛) is a Chinese computer scientist whose research in computer vision includes highly-cited work on low-light enhancement, raindrop removal, and the recognition of human actions. She is an associate professor and Boya Young Fellow in the Wangxuan Institute of Computer Technology of Peking University.

== Education and career ==
Liu graduated from Northwestern Polytechnical University in Xi'an in 2005, with a bachelor's degree in computer science. She received a Ph.D. in 2010 through Peking University, with the dissertation Rate Distortion Optimization Based Scalable Video Coding supervised by Zongming Guo. Her doctoral studies also included a visit to the University of Southern California, working there with C.-C. Jay Kuo.

She remained at Peking University as an assistant professor beginning in 2010, and has been an associate professor since 2012.

== Recognition ==
Liu was named as a distinguished member of the China Computer Federation in 2022. She was named to the 2025 class of IEEE Fellows "for contributions to intelligent visual compression and enhancement".
