= Yayuan Liu =

Chinese-American materials scientist

- Education: Nanyang Technological University; Stanford University; University of Illinois at Urbana–Champaign
- Scientific career
- Workplaces: Massachusetts Institute of Technology
- Thesis: Materials design and fundamental understanding of lithium metal anode for next-generation batteries (2018)
- Website: Personal website

Yayuan Liu (born 1992) is a Chinese-American materials scientist at the Massachusetts Institute of Technology. Her research considers electrochemistry, nanomaterials, and materials characterisation for the development of next-generation batteries. She was selected as one of the 2019 American Chemical Society Young Investigators and included in the 2021 Forbes 30 Under 30 list of top scientists.

== Early life and education ==
Liu is from China. She started her academic career at Nanyang Technological University, where she specialised in materials science and engineering. As an undergraduate student, she worked with Fengwei Huo on metal–organic frameworks. During her undergraduate studies, she spent a year at the University of Illinois at Urbana–Champaign, where she worked with Hong Yang on nanocrystals for electrocatalysis. After graduating from Nanyang Technological University in 2014 Liu returned to the United States, joining Yi Cui's laboratory to work on next-generation batteries. As a doctoral student at Stanford University, Liu developed a lithium fluoride coating technique that made use of Freon to passivate the lithium surfaces. By applying the coating to a graphene oxide electrodes, Liu managed to improve battery stability and Coulombic efficiency.

== Research and career ==
After earning her doctoral degree in 2019 Liu moved to the Massachusetts Institute of Technology, where she works alongside T. Alan Hatton on stimuli-responsive gas membranes. Broadly speaking, her work considers the design of new materials that allow high-capacity energy storage in electrochemistry applications. She has concentrated on lithium electrodes for next-generation batteries, which offer the potential for high specific capacities and low electrochemical potentials. Unfortunately, these electrodes are highly reactive and change volume during cycling. Liu has worked to minimise the change in volume through scaffold compositions, control the reactivity of the electrodes through solid electrolyte interfaces, and incorporate electrolyte additives to control the formation of interfaces.

== Awards and honours ==
- 2014 Nanyang Technological University Lee Kuan Yew Gold Medal
- 2019 American Chemical Society Division of Inorganic Chemistry Young Investigator Award
- 2019 Massachusetts Institute of Technology Communication Fellow
- 2019 Massachusetts Institute of Technology Rising Stars in Chemical Engineering
- 2020 University of Washington Distinguished Young Scholars Seminar Winner
- 2021 Forbes 30 Under 30
- 2023 MIT Technology Review Innovators Under 35

== Select publications ==
- Lin, Dingchang; Liu, Yayuan; Cui, Yi (2017). "Reviving the lithium metal anode for high-energy batteries". Nature Nanotechnology. 12 (3): 194–206. Bibcode:2017NatNa..12..194L. doi:10.1038/nnano.2017.16. ISSN 1748-3395. PMID 28265117.
- Lin, Dingchang; Liu, Yayuan; Liang, Zheng; Lee, Hyun-Wook; Sun, Jie; Wang, Haotian; Yan, Kai; Xie, Jin; Cui, Yi (2016). "Layered reduced graphene oxide with nanoscale interlayer gaps as a stable host for lithium metal anodes". Nature Nanotechnology. 11 (7): 626–632. Bibcode:2016NatNa..11..626L. doi:10.1038/nnano.2016.32. ISSN 1748-3395. PMID 26999479.
- Wang, Haotian; Lee, Hyun-Wook; Deng, Yong; Lu, Zhiyi; Hsu, Po-Chun; Liu, Yayuan; Lin, Dingchang; Cui, Yi (2015). "Bifunctional non-noble metal oxide nanoparticle electrocatalysts through lithium-induced conversion for overall water splitting". Nature Communications. 6 (1): 7261. Bibcode:2015NatCo...6.7261W. doi:10.1038/ncomms8261. ISSN 2041-1723. PMC 4557299. PMID 26099250.
