= Xin Liu (computer scientist) =

Chinese-American computer scientist

Xin Liu is a Chinese-American computer scientist whose research involves computer networks and the applications of machine learning to complex systems. She is a professor of computer science at the University of California, Davis.

== Education and career ==
Liu earned a bachelor's degree in electrical engineering from Xi'an Jiaotong University (XJTU) in 1994, and continued at XJTU for a master's degree in electrical engineering, advised jointly by Shihua Zhu and Xixing Zhu, in 1997. Her master's research concerned autofocus. She completed a Ph.D. in electrical and computer engineering at Purdue University in 2002, with the dissertation Opportunistic Scheduling in Wireless Communication Networks, jointly supervised by Ness Shroff and Edwin K. P. Chong.

After postdoctoral research with Rayadurgam Srikant at the Coordinated Science Laboratory of the University of Illinois Urbana-Champaign (UIUC), she became an assistant professor at UIUC in 2002. She took her present position at the University of California, Davis in 2003.

== Recognition ==
Liu was named an IEEE Fellow in 2019, "for contributions to the design of cross-layer resource allocation algorithms for cellular and cognitive radio networks".
