= Liu Xin (food scientist) =

Chinese scientist

Liu Xin (Chinese: 劉昕; born 1957 in Wuhan, Hubei), is a Chinese scientist.

Liu is the Dean of the Faculty of Food and Health Technology at Sun Yat-sen University. In 2008 he was elected to the 11th Chinese People's Political Consultative Conference, representing the agricultural sector, he was assigned to the 39th sub committee.
