= Liu Yan (dancer) =

Chinese dancer

- 刘岩 (Simplified) 劉岩 (Traditional)
- Born: June 1982
- Citizenship: China
- Education: Beijing Dance Academy
- Occupation: Dancer
- Style: Classical
- Parent(s): Liu Xueming (father); Wang Xinlian (mother)
- Website: blog.sina.com.cn/liuyan314

Liu Yan is a classical Chinese dancer, choreographer, stage director, and professor at the Beijing Dance Academy. She has performed in many dance dramas and won many dance competitions in and outside China.

== Early life ==
Liu had a passion for classical Chinese dance during her childhood. She started dancing at the age of nine. When she was ten years old, Liu gained admission to the Beijing Dance Academy middle school. In 1993, when she was eleven years old, she entered the Beijing Dance Academy middle school.

Liu enrolled at the Beijing Dance Academy at the age of eighteen. She studied professional dancing with a major in classical Chinese dance. She graduated in 2003.

== Career ==
Liu has performed in the 2007 CCTV New Year's Gala, alongside some of China's most famous people. She has also won some of the nation's most prestigious awards for dance and drama.

Liu was chosen to be the lead dancer in the "Silk Road" segment at the Beijing 2008 Olympics opening ceremony. On 27 July, twelve days before the actual performance, she fell from a malfunctioning moving platform during an evening rehearsal at the Beijing National Stadium. She was rushed to a local military hospital where she underwent six hours of surgery. The accident resulted in nerve and spinal damage, which paralyzed her lower body.

In March 2010, Liu established the Liu Yan Arts Special Fund to help children living in poverty, orphans, and migrant workers' children through arts education. Since March 2010, she has been giving classes at the Beijing Dance Academy. As reported in 2012, she pursued a doctorate degree in dance theory at the Beijing Dance Academy. As a professor at the Beijing Dance Academy, she is also devoted to dance movement therapy.

In 2016, Liu published a book titled Dance with Hands: Research of the Hand Dance in Chinese Classical Dances, detailing her research about hand gestures in classical Chinese dance.

On 18 June 2021, Liu staged her directorial debut with the dance drama Jing Yan at the Century Theater in Beijing. This is the first dance drama produced by the dance studio that Liu launched in 2019.
