= Liu Shaoqi =

President of China from 1959 to 1968

- 刘少奇
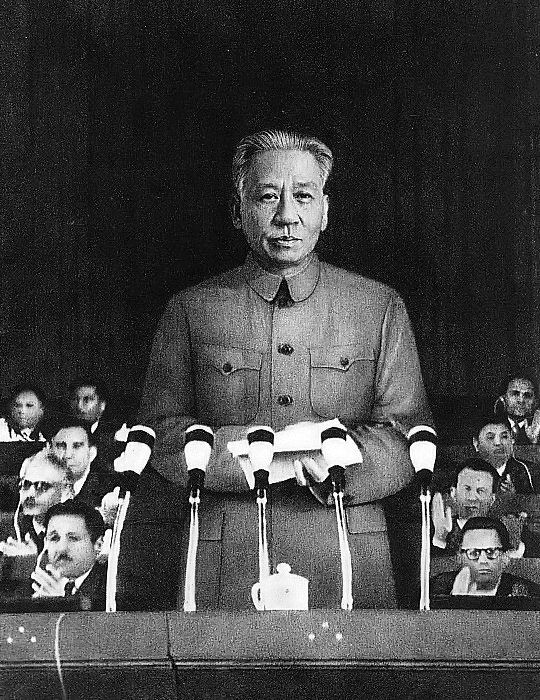
- Liu in 1959

Chairman of the People's Republic of China
- In office 27 April 1959 – 31 October 1968
- Premier: Zhou Enlai
- Vice President: Dong Biwu; Soong Ching-ling
- Leader: Mao Zedong (Chairman of the Chinese Communist Party)
- Preceded by: Mao Zedong
- Succeeded by: Dong Biwu; Soong Ching-ling (both acting)

1st Chairman of the Standing Committee of the National People's Congress
- In office 27 September 1954 – 27 April 1959
- Preceded by: Position established
- Succeeded by: Zhu De

Vice Chairman of the Chinese Communist Party
- In office 28 September 1956 – 1 August 1966
- Chairman: Mao Zedong

Delegate to the National People's Congress
- In office 15 September 1954 – 21 October 1968
- Constituency: Beijing at-large

Vice Chairman of the Central People's Government
- In office 1 October 1949 – 27 September 1954 Serving with Zhu De, Soong Ching-ling, Li Jishen, Zhang Lan, Gao Gang
- Chairman: Mao Zedong

Personal details
- Born: 24 November 1898 Ningxiang, Hunan, Qing China
- Died: 12 November 1969 (aged 70) Kaifeng, Henan, China
- Party: Chinese Communist Party (1921–1968)
- Spouses: He Baozhen (m. 1923; died 1934); Xie Fei (m. 1935; div. 1940); Wang Qian (m. 1942; div. 1943); Wang Guangmei (m. 1948)
- Children: 9 (including Liu Yunbin and Liu Yuan)
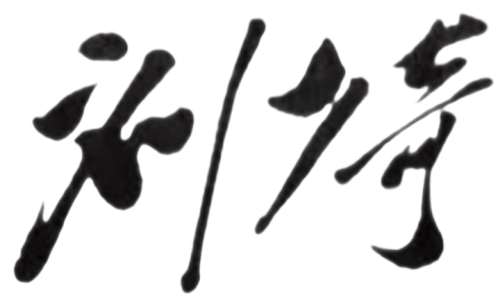
- Signature

Liu Shaoqi
- Simplified Chinese: 刘少奇
- Traditional Chinese: 劉少奇
Transcriptions
Standard Mandarin
- Hanyu Pinyin: Liú Shàoqí
- Gwoyeu Romatzyh: Liou Shawchyi
- Wade–Giles: Liu^{2} Shao^{4}-ch'i^{2}
- IPA: [ljǒʊ ʂâʊtɕʰǐ]
Yue: Cantonese
- Jyutping: Lau4 Siu2-kei4

Liu Shaoqi (Chinese: 刘少奇; pronounced [ljǒʊ ʂâʊtɕʰǐ]; 24 November 1898 – 12 November 1969) was a Chinese revolutionary and politician. He was the chairman of the Standing Committee of the National People's Congress from 1954 to 1959, first-ranking vice chairman of the Chinese Communist Party (CCP) from 1956 to 1966, and the chairman of the People's Republic of China (president of China) from 1959 to 1968. He was considered to be a possible successor to Chairman Mao Zedong, but was purged during the Cultural Revolution.

In his early years, Liu participated in the labor movement, including the May Thirtieth Movement. After the Chinese Civil War began in 1927, he was assigned by the CCP to work in Shanghai and Northeast China, and travelled to the Jiangxi Soviet in 1932. He participated in the Long March, and was appointed as the Party Secretary in North China in 1936 to lead anti-Japanese resistance efforts in the area. During the Second Sino-Japanese War, Liu led the CCP's Central Plains Bureau. After the New Fourth Army incident in 1941, Liu became a political commissar of the New Fourth Army. After Liu returned to Yan'an in 1943, he became a secretary of the CCP Secretariat and a vice chairman of the Central Military Commission.

After the proclamation of the People's Republic of China in 1949, Liu became a vice chairman of the Central People's Government. After the establishment of the National People's Congress in 1954, Liu was elected as the chairman of its Standing Committee. In 1959, he succeeded Mao Zedong as the chairman of the People's Republic of China. During his chairmanship, he implemented policies of economic reconstruction in China, especially after the Seven Thousand Cadres Conference in 1962. Liu was publicly named as Mao's chosen successor in 1961. However, he was criticized and then purged by Mao soon after the beginning of the Cultural Revolution in 1966, eventually being placed under house arrest in 1967. He was forced out of public life and was labelled the "commander of China's bourgeoisie headquarters", China's foremost "capitalist roader", and a traitor to the revolution. He died in prison in 1969 due to complications from diabetes. Liu was widely condemned in the years following his death until he was posthumously rehabilitated by Deng Xiaoping's government in 1980, as part of the Boluan Fanzheng period. Deng's government granted Liu a national memorial service.

== Early life ==
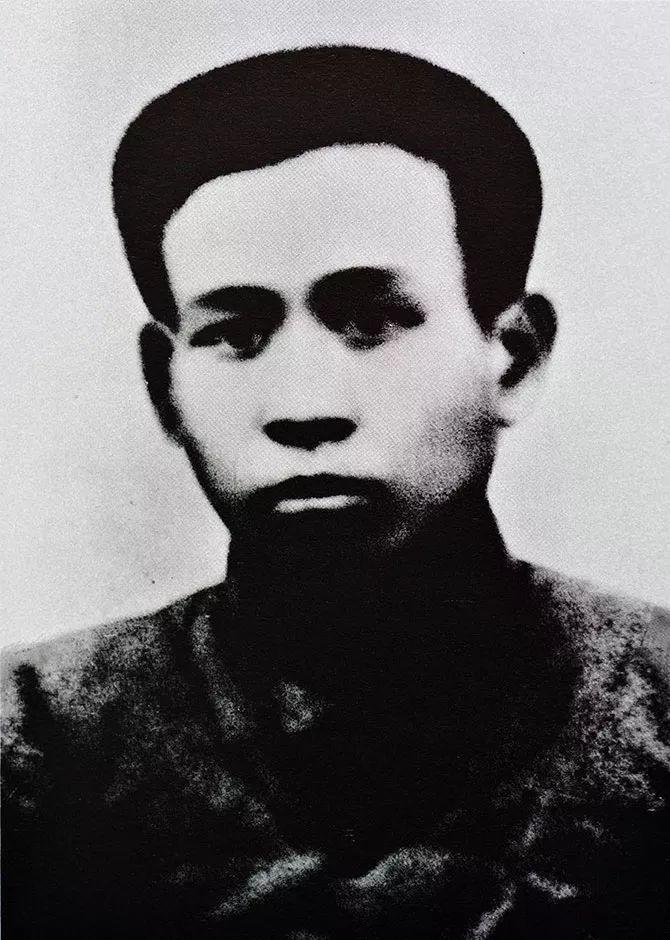
Liu Shaoqi, 1927

Liu was born on 24 November 1898 in a mud-brick farmhouse in Tanzichong, Huaminglou Township, Ningxiang, Hunan Province. He was the youngest child of Liu Shousheng (1865–1911) and his wife, surnamed Lu (1864–1931). According to the family genealogy, his given name was Shaoxuan, and his courtesy name was Weihuang. At home, he was affectionately called Jiuman, marking him as the ninth and youngest child of his generation.

From the age of eight, Liu attended a series of village private schools, studying classical texts, such as the Classic of Poetry and the Zuo Zhuan, as well as arithmetic, and he went on to receive a modern education. His father's death in 1910 briefly interrupted his schooling. After hearing his brother's accounts of the 1911 Revolution, the young Liu insisted that his sister cut off her queue to show a break with the Qing dynasty. In 1913, he entered Ningxiang County No. 1 Higher Primary School, and in January 1916, he joined student marches against Yuan Shikai's restoration of the monarchy.

Later in 1916, his mother arranged a marriage for him, which he soon broke off. He took first place in the entrance examination for the Hunan Military Academy in Changsha, but the academy, which opened only in May 1917, was disbanded that October when the North–South War reached Hunan. After a year of studying on his own at home, he graduated from Yucai Middle School in 1919.

In mid-1919, as the May Fourth Movement was winding down, Liu went to Beijing and then enrolled in a preparatory class in Baoding, Hebei, for students planning to study in France. There, he read progressive journals, such as New Youth, and learned about the October Revolution and the Bolshevik Party. In August 1920, he joined the Chinese Socialist Youth League and entered the Shanghai Foreign Language School, which prepared students to study in Russia.

Liu arrived in Moscow on 9 July 1921 and enrolled in the Chinese class of the Communist University of the Toilers of the East. That winter, introduced by Luo Yinong, he and several classmates, including Peng Shuzhi, became members of the Chinese Communist Party (CCP). His time at the university helped prepare him for his later work organizing trade unions, strikes, and underground party committees. He returned to China in the spring of 1922 and began working for the Secretariat of the Chinese Labor Union in Shanghai.

== Early political activities ==
=== Early revolutionary activities ===
In the summer of 1922, Liu went to Changsha, where Mao Zedong, then secretary of the CCP's Hunan District Executive Committee, immediately appointed him to the committee. That September, Liu and Li Lisan led the Anyuan coal miners' and railway workers' strike. While Li commanded the strike, Liu represented the workers in negotiations with the railway and mining authorities. After thousands of workers surrounded the martial law headquarters, the authorities softened their stance, and the strike ended in victory on 18 September. Liu went on to head the Anyuan workers' club, becoming its general director in 1923. In 1924, after the CCP decided that its members could join the Kuomintang (KMT) as individuals, he also joined the KMT.

From 1925, Liu was one of the CCP's leading labor organizers. He sat on the executive committee of the Guangzhou-based All-China Federation of Labor, worked with Li Lisan in Shanghai after the May Thirtieth Movement, and helped organize the 16-month Canton–Hong Kong strike. In December 1925, while recovering from lung disease in Changsha, he was arrested on the orders of the Hunan governor, Zhao Hengti. Relatives and local notables pleaded for him, and he was released in February 1926 on condition that he leave Hunan immediately. In May 1926, he became secretary-general of the All-China Federation of Trade Unions. His writings from this period argued that unions must be run democratically, with real power held by elected workers' representative assemblies rather than by a few leaders.

After the National Revolutionary Army took Wuhan during the Northern Expedition, Liu led the mass movement that reclaimed the British concession in Hankou in January 1927. In May, he was elected to the CCP Central Committee at the party's 5th National Congress and became head of its Labor Department. Over these years, he developed a cautious approach of "going deep into the masses, hiding for a long time, and accumulating strength", and resisted the "leftist" adventurism then common in the party leadership. A relapse of lung disease kept him out of front-line work for much of late 1927. In 1928, the party sent him to Tianjin to help lead the railway unions and the party's work in northern China.

=== Chinese Civil War ===
In the summer of 1929, Liu became secretary of the CCP's Manchurian Provincial Committee in Fengtian. He was arrested at a Fengtian cotton mill on suspicion of inciting a strike, but a court released him on bail for lack of evidence. This arrest later became a key piece of "evidence" for branding him a traitor.

In 1930, Liu led the Chinese trade union delegation to the Fifth Congress of the Red International of Trade Unions in Moscow. He was elected an alternate member of the Politburo in January 1931, and, after the execution of General Secretary Xiang Zhongfa, he joined the provisional Politburo formed in Shanghai, heading the party's Workers' Department. In March 1932, on instructions from the Comintern, he was removed from that post, though he remained an alternate Politburo member. At the end of 1932, he left Shanghai for the Central Soviet Area, and in 1934, he became party secretary of Fujian.

In October 1934, Liu set out on the Long March as the Central Committee's representative, first to the Red Army's Eighth Army Corps and then, after heavy losses led to its disbandment, to the Fifth Army Corps. At the Zunyi Conference in January 1935, he supported Mao. In October 1935, he married Xie Fei, and by the end of the year, he had reached northern Shaanxi, where he attended the Wayaobao Conference.

In the spring of 1936, Liu went to Tianjin as the Central Committee's representative to lead its Northern Bureau, rebuilding underground party work in the KMT-controlled "White Areas" around Beijing and Tianjin. With Zhang Wentian's approval on behalf of the Central Committee, he arranged for about sixty imprisoned party members - the so-called 61 Renegades - to win release from the Caolanzi Penitentiary by signing and publishing "anti-communist announcements", as the prison authorities required. The freed cadres greatly strengthened the Northern Bureau, but during the Cultural Revolution, this episode became one of the main charges against Liu. His writings of this period called for mass organization and democratic working methods, and criticized the party's past "closed-doorism" and adventurism.

In early 1937, Liu wrote to Zhang Wentian arguing that the party's line over the previous ten years had been mistaken, breaking the consensus reached at Zunyi and causing controversy within the party. Mao tacitly approved, and the episode laid the foundation for the later political alliance between the two men. Liu returned to Yan'an at the end of April 1937.

=== Second Sino-Japanese War ===
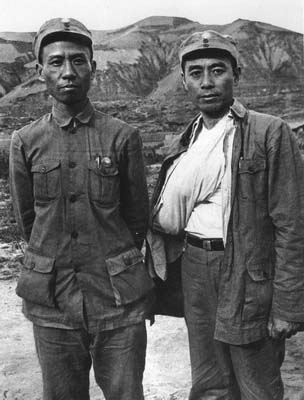
Liu Shaoqi and Zhou Enlai, 1939

After the outbreak of the Second Sino-Japanese War, Liu moved the Northern Bureau to Taiyuan, Shanxi, and established contact with the regional ruler Yan Xishan. Assisted by Peng Zhen, An Ziwen, Bo Yibo, and others, he ordered cadres in the fallen cities of Beijing and Tianjin to move to the countryside and wage guerrilla war, and led the creation of CCP base areas behind Japanese lines in northern China. In 1938, Liu and Zhang Wentian were the strongest opponents of Mao's marriage to Jiang Qing.

After the sixth plenum of the 6th Central Committee in late 1938, Liu became secretary of the new Central Plains Bureau, responsible for building CCP influence between the Yellow River and the Yangtze River and for taking part in the military work of the New Fourth Army in Anhui, Henan, and Jiangsu. On 8 July 1939, during a visit to Yan'an, he delivered his best-known speech, On the Self-Cultivation of Communist Party Members (published in English as How to Be a Good Communist), which urged party members to cultivate hard work, close ties with the masses, and scientific knowledge.

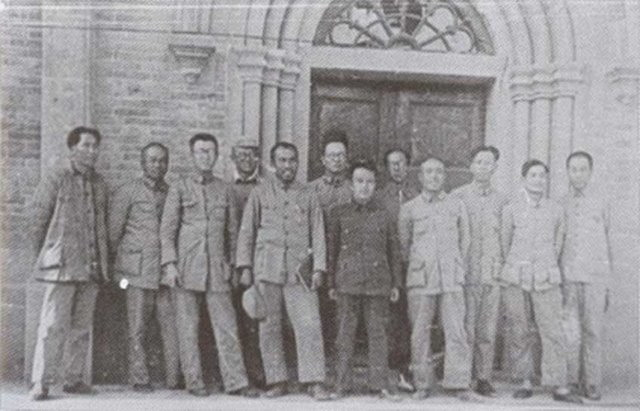
At the Sixth Plenary Session of the 6th Central Committee of the Chinese Communist Party in the autumn of 1938, from left to right: Mao Zedong, Peng Dehuai, Wang Jiaxiang, Zhang Wentian, Zhu De, Bo Gu, Wang Ming, Kang Sheng, Xiang Ying, Liu Shaoqi, Chen Yun, and Zhou Enlai.

Returning behind enemy lines in late 1939, Liu urged New Fourth Army units to "advance eastward" into the Japanese rear and to build base areas by mobilizing peasants through rent and interest reduction, better treatment of hired laborers, and armed mass organizations. Under this strategy, New Fourth Army troops under Chen Yi and Su Yu won the Huangqiao Campaign in October 1940 and linked up with the Eighth Route Army, joining the CCP's bases in northern and central China. Liu became political commissar of the new joint headquarters in November, but the Caodian Campaign he launched against KMT forces that winter failed, at a cost of nearly 2,000 casualties.

The CCP's rapid expansion in northern Jiangsu and the resulting friction with the KMT led to the Southern Anhui Incident of January 1941, in which KMT forces destroyed the New Fourth Army's headquarters column. Its commander, Ye Ting, was captured, and Xiang Ying was later killed. Liu urged a political rather than military counteroffensive and pressed for the army's immediate reconstruction. On 20 January, he was appointed political commissar of the rebuilt New Fourth Army, with Chen Yi as acting commander and its headquarters at Yancheng. In May 1941, he also became secretary of the new Central China Bureau. Under his leadership, the army grew from about 90,000 to 135,000 troops. In lectures at the bureau's party school, he set out rules for conducting struggle within the party and warned that bureaucracy could become a serious danger once a communist party came to power.

Liu left central China in March 1942 and reached Yan'an on 30 December, settling disputes among the CCP's military and political leaders in Shandong on the way. He now entered the party's core leadership as one of its five secretaries. During the Yan'an Rectification Movement, he and Mao accused Zhou Enlai of "right-leaning" errors, and Zhou was forced to apologize publicly several times.

At the 7th Party Congress (April–June 1945), Liu delivered the report on revising the party constitution, which for the first time made Mao Zedong Thought the party's guiding ideology. He also set out four "mass viewpoints" for every party member: "everything for the masses, full responsibility to the masses, faith in the self-emancipation of the masses, and learning from the masses". After the congress, he was elected to the five-member Central Secretariat alongside Mao, Zhu De, Zhou Enlai, and Ren Bishi, and became a vice chairman of the party's military commission and director of its General Political Department. According to Lowell Dittmer, he also became the supreme leader of all CCP forces in Manchuria and northern China, a role historians frequently overlook.

=== Resumption of the Civil War ===
While Mao negotiated with Chiang Kai-shek in Chongqing after Japan's surrender in 1945, Liu acted as chairman of the Central Committee in Yan'an. He set the strategy of "developing northward and defending southward" to secure the Northeast, and, in 1946, issued the "May 4 Instructions", which replaced the wartime policy of rent and interest reduction with the redistribution of land to the peasants.

After KMT forces captured Yan'an in March 1947, Liu led the party's Central Working Committee, together with Zhu De and others, to Xibaipo in Hebei. There, he presided over the National Land Conference, which adopted the Outline of the Land Law of China, confiscating the land of landlords and rich peasants for distribution to poor and middle peasants. Mao and the rest of the leadership joined him at Xibaipo in April 1948, and, as vice chairman of the military commission, Liu helped direct the decisive Liaoshen, Huaihai, and Pingjin campaigns.

From June to August 1949, Liu led a secret CCP delegation, including Gao Gang and Wang Jiaxiang, to the Soviet Union, where Joseph Stalin agreed to lend China $300 million and to send Soviet experts. Liu set out how the new government would treat the KMT's foreign treaties, including the Sino-Soviet Treaty of Friendship and Alliance, and explained how the CCP had defended Soviet positions on Port Arthur, Mongolian independence, and the removal of machinery from Northeast China against critics at home. Stalin deferred the treaty question until Mao's visit to Moscow. In September 1949, Liu was elected a vice chairman of the Central People's Government.

== People's Republic of China ==
On 1 October 1949, Liu attended the founding ceremony of the People's Republic of China, and later that month, he was elected vice chairman of the People's Revolutionary Military Commission.

=== Land reform ===
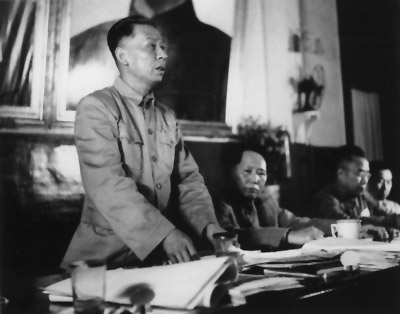
Liu Shaoqi's report on land reform at the third Plenary Session of the 7th Central Committee of the Chinese Communist Party

In June 1950, Liu became head of the Central Land Reform Committee, which guided the nationwide Land Reform Movement under a new Land Reform Law. The law confiscated landlords' land for redistribution while protecting middle peasants and the peasant economy. According to official figures, grain output in 1952 was 42.8% higher than in 1949. That year, Liu also led the CCP delegation to the 19th Congress of the Communist Party of the Soviet Union.

In the early 1950s, Gao Gang, head of the new State Planning Commission, concluded from Mao's occasional criticisms of Liu that Mao meant to sideline him. Gao allied with Rao Shushi to attack Liu, and Liu responded by joining forces with Zhou Enlai. With Mao's consent, the two criticized Gao at the fourth plenum in February 1954, bringing about his downfall.

=== Chairman of the Standing Committee of the National People's Congress ===
At the first session of the 1st National People's Congress in September 1954, Liu presented the draft of the first Constitution of the People's Republic of China on behalf of its drafting committee, and on 27 September, he was elected Chairman of the Standing Committee of the National People's Congress. In 1955, he argued that party committees should stop running day-to-day business and concentrate on supervising cadres and on political and organizational work.

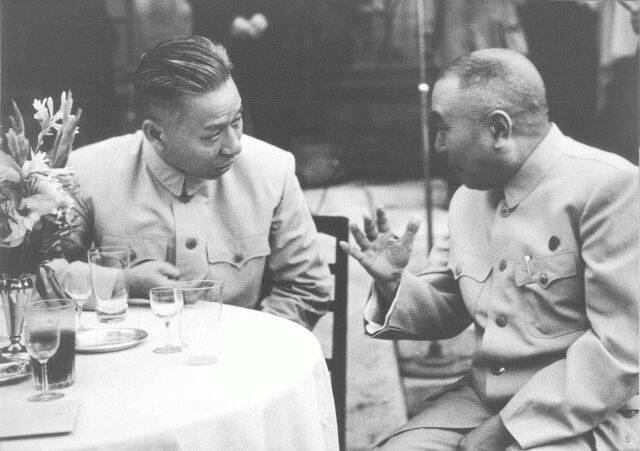
In 1951, Liu and Huang Yanpei had a conversation.

At the 8th Party Congress in September 1956, Liu delivered the main political report, arguing that with socialist transformation complete, the party's focus should shift to developing the productive forces. He was elected to the Politburo Standing Committee as the first-ranked vice chairman of the party. In October, he led a delegation, including Deng Xiaoping, to Moscow, where, during the Hungarian Revolution of 1956, he argued against a Soviet withdrawal from Hungary. Back in Beijing, he warned that a privileged "aristocratic class" detached from the people could emerge in socialist countries, even within the Communist Party, unless safeguards were adopted.

In 1956, Liu backed Zhou Enlai's efforts to scale back overambitious economic targets, a policy known as "opposing rash advance". Mao was displeased and later called it a policy error. After Mao attacked the policy and Zhou made a self-criticism, the way was clear for the Great Leap Forward.

==== Great Leap Forward ====
In early 1958, Mao launched the Great Leap Forward, and Liu, as a front-line leader, became one of its most active promoters. He spoke strongly in its favor at the second session of the 8th Party Congress in May 1958, siding with Deng Xiaoping and Peng Zhen against more cautious leaders, such as Chen Yun, and Zhou Enlai. He promoted large people's communes, public canteens, and mass steel production, and, in July 1958, predicted that China would overtake Britain in steel output within two or three years, and the United States within seven or eight. On inspection tours, he encouraged inflated harvest claims. When problems emerged at the end of 1958, he admitted that he too had been "a bit hot-headed and said some excessive things".

=== Chairman of the People's Republic of China ===
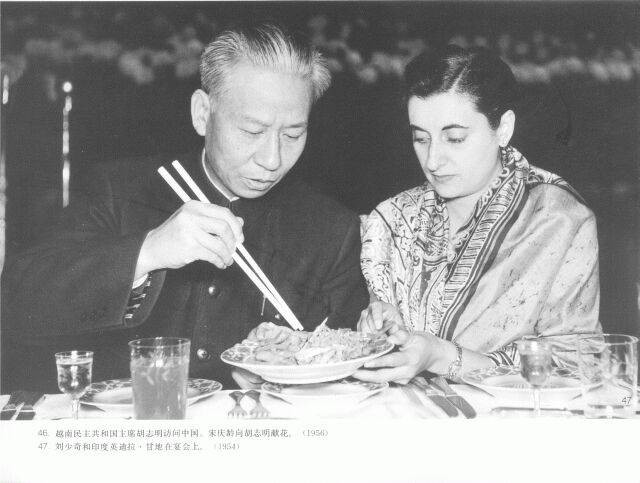
Liu Shaoqi and Indira Gandhi, 1954

Mao had designated Liu as his successor soon after 1949, and, in December 1953, proposed that Liu take charge of "front-line" work while Mao retired to the "second line". When Mao visited the Soviet Union in late 1957, he told Nikita Khrushchev that Liu would succeed him as head of state, and at the end of 1958, the party accepted Mao's proposal not to seek re-election. In March 1959, Liu and Deng Xiaoping chaired meetings on the response to the 1959 Tibetan uprising, concluding that the uprising now required the government to carry out "democratic reforms" in Tibet. On 27 April 1959, the 2nd National People's Congress elected Liu Chairman of the People's Republic of China, with Soong Ching-ling and Dong Biwu as vice chairpersons.

Liu's work centered on party organization and theory. He drafted party regulations and oversaw the party's organizational development along Marxist–Leninist lines.

==== Lushan Conference ====
At the Lushan Conference in July 1959, Peng Dehuai wrote to Mao about the mistakes of the Great Leap Forward. Mao denounced the letter as "bourgeois wavering" and "right-leaning", and Liu and others joined in criticizing Peng, turning a meeting meant to correct "leftist" excesses into a campaign against the "right". The plenum that followed condemned Peng, Huang Kecheng, Zhang Wentian, and Zhou Xiaozhou as an "anti-Party clique". To uphold Mao's authority, Liu then took part in an unprecedented promotion of Mao's personality cult, which for a time made the Leap's mistakes harder to correct.

==== Great Chinese Famine ====
As the Great Chinese Famine deepened, Liu began to change course. In January 1961, he called the previous year's steel target a mistake and urged leaders at every level to take particular care with peasants' interests, warning that their economic weakness left them exposed to abuse. From April 1961, he carried out an extended investigation in rural Hunan, including his home village, and saw at first hand the damage done by the Leap. The experience changed his thinking significantly: he decided to disband the communal canteens and began correcting the Leap's excesses.

==== Seven Thousand Cadres Conference ====
At the Seven Thousand Cadres Conference in January 1962, Liu delivered the Central Committee's report and a long supplementary speech. Rejecting the formula that the Leap's achievements outweighed its mistakes by nine fingers to one, he said that nationally the ratio was closer to seven to three, and that, in some regions, mistakes predominated. Quoting peasants in Hunan, he summed up the crisis as "three parts natural disaster, seven parts man-made disaster". He called on the party to overcome exaggeration, coercion, bureaucracy, and detachment from the masses, and to concentrate on reviving the economy.

Liu did not, however, clear Peng Dehuai. When delegates called for the verdict on Peng to be reversed, Liu said that Peng's letter itself was not the problem, but that Peng had been "colluding with foreign countries", a charge that made his rehabilitation impossible.

In February 1962, Liu chaired the Xilou Meeting of the Politburo Standing Committee and began a comprehensive readjustment of the economy, and he and Zhou Enlai backed Chen Yun to head the Central Financial and Economic Group. That August, the People's Daily and Red Flag republished On the Self-Cultivation of Communist Party Members. Mao believed that passages criticizing Chen Duxiu's arrogance were aimed at him, and, during the Cultural Revolution, the book was attacked as "Black Cultivation". At the Beidaihe work conference and the tenth plenum later in 1962, Mao renewed his emphasis on class struggle and attacked the "dark wind" and the "individual farming wind". Liu made a self-criticism and publicly agreed with Mao, but he, Zhou, and Deng tried to keep the party's focus on economic recovery.

==== Three-Year Recovery Period and the Socialist Education Movement ====
With Deng Xiaoping, Liu pursued pragmatic recovery policies such as the Three Freedoms and One Guarantee, which allowed private plots, free markets, and household production quotas. Mao came to see their approach as a political line different from his own. Liu led a group of officials who sought to revive the economy through a greater role for markets, more material incentives for workers, lower investment, slower development targets, and more funding for consumer industries. In 1964, he was initially reluctant to back Mao's Third Front campaign to build basic and defense industry in China's interior, and proposed further surveys to slow it because, according to Covell F. Meyskens, he did not want another rapid industrialization drive so soon after the Leap. After the Gulf of Tonkin incident heightened fears of an American invasion, Liu fully supported the campaign.

At the same time, Liu took a leading role in the Socialist Education Movement, known as the "Four Cleanups" in the countryside and the "Five Antis" in the cities. Accepting Mao's call to "oppose and prevent revisionism", he revised the movement's guiding "Later Ten Articles" and directed the campaign. His wife, Wang Guangmei, led a work team at Taoyuan Brigade in Hebei, and her "Taoyuan Experience" became the model for the campaign. As the movement deepened, excesses appeared, and differences with Mao surfaced: Liu concentrated on grassroots cadres and "bad elements", while Mao insisted that the root of revisionism lay among "capitalist roaders" in the party's upper ranks. At the Central Work Conference at the end of 1964, the dispute became open, and Mao prevailed. By then, Mao had linked Liu with "revisionism in the Central Committee", and their relationship broke down. Liu was nonetheless re-elected head of state by the 3rd National People's Congress (December 1964 – January 1965) and became chairman of the National Defense Commission.

=== Cultural Revolution ===
Liu was publicly acknowledged as Mao's chosen successor in 1961, but by 1962, his opposition to Mao's policies had cost him Mao's trust. Once Mao had restored his prestige in the 1960s, Liu's downfall became, in Jonathan Spence's assessment, "inevitable". Historian Qiu Jin argues that Liu's position as the party's second-most powerful leader fueled Mao's rivalry with him at least as much as their policy differences, especially after the Seven Thousand Cadres Conference.

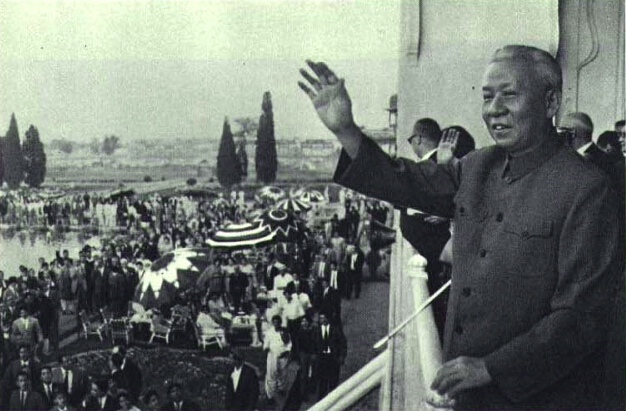
Liu Shaoqi in June 1966, the first year of the Cultural Revolution

When the Cultural Revolution began in May 1966, Liu at first supported it. He chaired the enlarged Politburo meeting that formally launched it, and in late June, he denounced Peng Zhen, Luo Ruiqing, Lu Dingyi, and Yang Shangkun as opponents of Mao, while praising Mao Zedong Thought as "the beacon of mankind". In June, however, Liu and Deng sent work teams into universities and schools to control the student movement, banning marches and big-character posters. Mao condemned this as suppression, saying that only the Beiyang warlords had suppressed student movements, and ordered the teams withdrawn. At the eleventh plenum in August 1966, Mao targeted Liu directly with his call to "bombard the bourgeois headquarters". Lin Biao replaced Liu as the party's second-in-command, and Liu fell to eighth place in the Politburo Standing Committee.

The Cultural Revolution gave Mao the power to purge his opponents at the highest levels of the party. Most senior leaders who had shown any hesitation in following him, Liu and Deng among them, were removed from their posts and, with their families, subjected to mass criticism and humiliation as "capitalist roaders". Liu was branded the "commander of China's bourgeois headquarters", "the biggest capitalist roader in the Party", and a traitor to the revolution.

==== Downfall ====
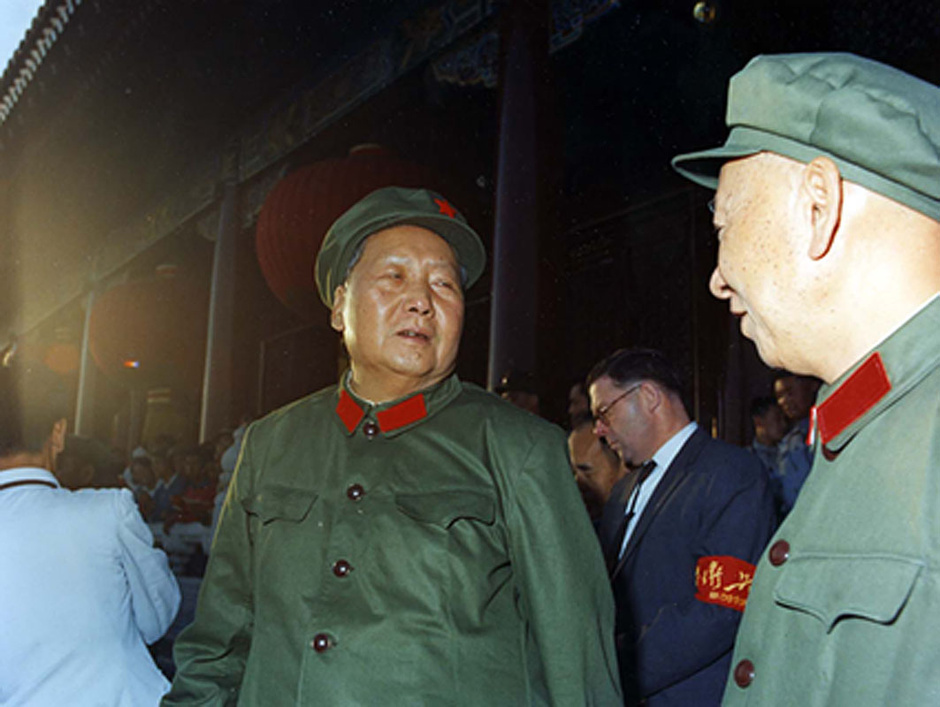
On 15 September 1966, Mao Zedong and Liu Shaoqi talked on the Tiananmen Rostrum, at which point a rift had already appeared between them.

At a central work conference in October 1966, Liu and Deng were identified as representatives of a "bourgeois reactionary line" and made self-criticisms that were circulated nationwide. In December, Jiang Qing publicly declared Liu "the Khrushchev of the Party", and slogans reading "Down with Liu Shaoqi" appeared across Beijing. A special case group, nominally investigating Wang Guangmei and directed by Jiang Qing and Kang Sheng, was set up to build the case against Liu.

On 1 January 1967, students rallied in Tiananmen Square to denounce Liu and Deng, and rebels in Zhongnanhai put up posters at Liu's residence calling for the overthrow of "China's Khrushchev". On 3 January, the rebels subjected Liu and Wang Guangmei to their first struggle session. Holding up a copy of the constitution, Liu protested that, as head of state and as a citizen, he was entitled to its protection. Days later, rebels from Tsinghua University lured Wang out of Zhongnanhai and detained her until Zhou Enlai intervened. On 13 January, Liu met Mao for the last time. He offered to resign all his posts and to farm with his family in Yan'an or his hometown, but Mao told him only to "study hard and take care of his health". Soon afterward, Liu's telephone line was removed, and he lost his personal freedom.

The attacks escalated through 1967. In May, the People's Daily and Red Flag denounced On Self-Cultivation as a "betrayal of the dictatorship of the proletariat", launching a nationwide campaign of criticism. Liu and Wang were placed under house arrest, and his economic policies, including the Three Freedoms and One Guarantee and the "four freedoms" that let rural households lease land, lend money, hire labor, and trade, were condemned. In July, after Red Guards encouraged by Jiang Qing had besieged Zhongnanhai, Jiang, Kang Sheng, and Chen Boda organized a mass rally at which Liu and Wang were forced to bow for more than two hours while their home was ransacked. That year, Red Flag also published Qi Benyu's article "Patriotism or Treason?", which called Liu a "counter-revolutionary" and "Khrushchev sleeping next to us". After a further resignation letter in August 1967 went unanswered, Liu stopped writing appeals and fell silent, even as the People's Daily openly named him "China's Khrushchev".

==== Expulsion from the CCP ====
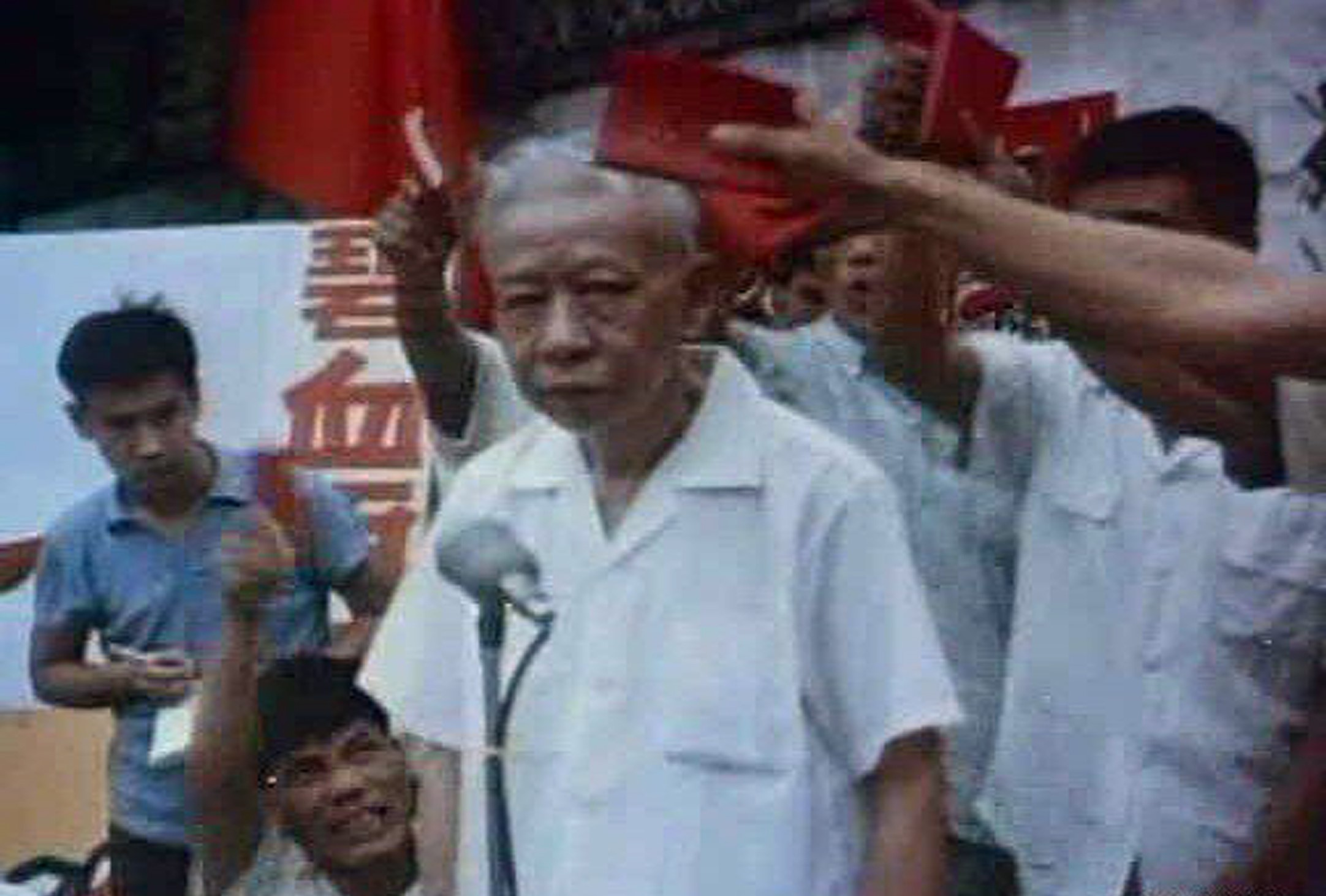
Liu Shaoqi being subjected to public humiliation at a rally during the Cultural Revolution in 1967

On 18 October 1968, the Central Committee's special case group, whose members included Zhou Enlai, Jiang Qing, Kang Sheng, and Xie Fuzhi, submitted a report accusing Liu of being a "traitor, spy, and scab", citing his arrests in 1925, 1927, and 1929. On 31 October, the twelfth plenum of the 8th Central Committee approved the report and expelled Liu from the party "forever", removing him from all posts. By then, 71% of the 8th Central Committee's members and alternates had been labeled traitors, spies, or "anti-Party elements", and many were barred from the meeting, and only one attendee, Chen Shaomin, opposed the resolution. The post of state chairman remained vacant until the 4th National People's Congress abolished it in 1975.

At the 9th Party Congress in April 1969, Lin Biao's political report celebrated the destruction of the "bourgeois headquarters headed by Liu Shaoqi", and Liu was officially denounced as a traitor and enemy agent in the service of the imperialists, modern revisionists, and the KMT.

== Illness and death ==
Held in solitary confinement in Zhongnanhai, Liu declined physically and mentally. By April 1968, he suffered from pneumonia, diabetes, hypertension, and nervous disorders, struggled to move his legs, and was often confused. In July 1968, acute bronchitis developed into bronchopneumonia, and doctors judged him critically ill and recommended hospitalization, but this was refused, and they had to treat him on site with borrowed equipment. He remained bedridden with repeated relapses and, from October 1968, could be fed only through a nasogastric tube. A clinic report that month warned that another serious relapse could kill him, while stressing that he must be kept from "dying in the short term". By early 1969, he had developed muscle degeneration and incontinence.

In October 1969, amid nationwide war preparations ordered by Mao, the leadership decided to move Liu and other purged leaders out of Beijing. Liu had told his family: "Fortunately, history is written by the people." On 17 October, he was flown to Kaifeng, Henan, accompanied by a doctor, two nurses, and his former bodyguard, and held in the former Tongheyu Bank building in the compound of the Kaifeng Revolutionary Committee. The cold worsened his condition. On 6 November, his Beijing medical team was ordered home and his care passed to the local garrison. Days later, he developed a persistent high fever, and he died at 06:45 on 12 November 1969, aged 70. He was registered for cremation under his old courtesy name, "Liu Weihuang", and his body was falsely described as that of a patient with a highly contagious disease. It was secretly cremated on 14 November, and the ashes were stored in an ordinary wooden box at the Kaifeng crematorium.

Liu's principal physician, Gu Qihua, later disputed claims of medical maltreatment. In his memoir, he wrote that a dedicated team monitored Liu daily, treated seven bouts of pneumonia between July 1968 and October 1969, and held about 40 specialist consultations. The cause of death is given as complications of diabetes.

== Rehabilitation, commemoration and evaluation ==
After the arrest of the Gang of Four in October 1976 ended the Cultural Revolution, the third plenum of the 11th Central Committee in December 1978 began correcting "leftist" errors and redressing wrongful cases. Cadres and ordinary citizens wrote in demanding Liu's exoneration. During the Cultural Revolution, some who had questioned his case, such as Zhang Zhixin, had been executed as counter-revolutionaries. In February 1979, the party ordered a review of the case. On 24 February 1980, the fifth plenum of the 11th Central Committee unanimously rehabilitated Liu as "one of the leaders of the Party and the State", calling him "a great Marxist and proletarian revolutionary".

In May 1980, Liu's ashes were brought from Kaifeng to Beijing, and on 17 May, a state memorial service attended by more than 10,000 people was held in the Great Hall of the People, with Deng Xiaoping delivering the eulogy. Liu had asked that his ashes be scattered at sea, like those of Engels, and on 19 May, Wang Guangmei and other relatives scattered them in the Yellow Sea from the destroyer Anshan off Qingdao. In the 1981 trial of the Lin Biao and Jiang Qing cliques, Jiang Qing was sentenced to death with a reprieve and Chen Boda to imprisonment, in part for framing and persecuting Liu to death.

At a 2008 event marking the 110th anniversary of his birth, CCP General Secretary Hu Jintao praised Liu as "a great Marxist, a great proletarian revolutionary, statesman, and theorist" and a founding father of the People's Republic. On 23 November 2018, General Secretary Xi Jinping gave a speech in the Great Hall of the People commemorating the 120th anniversary of Liu's birth.

== Personal life ==
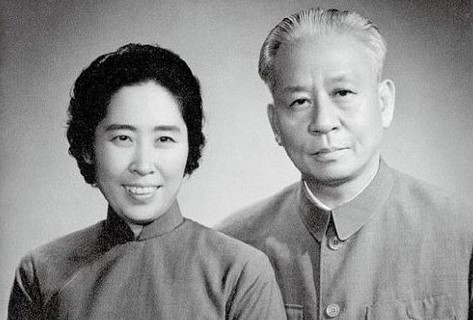
Liu with his wife Wang Guangmei, 1960s

Liu's family had moved to Hunan from Jishui in Jiangxi several generations earlier. His father, Liu Shousheng, had four sons and two daughters and insisted that all his sons attend private school. The family farmed 30 mu of its own land, leased out another 30 and rented 15 more. In 1958, the local government turned the family home into a museum, but when Liu visited in 1961, he had the plan canceled and the house given to local farmers. During the Cultural Revolution, villagers concealed the location of the family graves, so both the house and the graves survived.

Liu married six times. His first marriage, arranged by his mother in 1916 to a woman surnamed Zhou from a neighboring village, was soon broken off. In April 1923, he married He Baozhen, a party member who taught at the Anyuan workers' children's school. She was arrested in Shanghai in 1933 and executed in Nanjing the following year, and Liu praised her as "brave and resolute, outstanding among women party members". They had two sons, Liu Yunbin and Liu Yunruo, and a daughter, Liu Aiqin, whom Liu brought back from the Soviet Union in 1949.

His third wife, Xie Fei, was a fisherman's daughter, and they had no children. His fourth wife, Wang Qian, was a New Fourth Army nurse. They had a son, Liu Yunzhen, and a daughter, Liu Tao, and separated in 1946. A fifth marriage, to Wang Jian, who had been introduced to him by Zhu De and his wife, lasted only a few days because of her poor health, and Liu sent her to Northeast China to recuperate.

On 21 August 1948, at Xibaipo, Liu married Wang Guangmei, who had earned a master's degree in physics at the Fu Jen Catholic University in 1945 and had worked as an interpreter for the Communist delegation at the Executive Headquarters in Beijing. Their son Liu Yuan became a general and political commissar of the People's Liberation Army's General Logistics Department, retiring in December 2015. Wang Guangmei was jailed in 1967 and spent 12 years in prison. After her release, she devoted herself to poverty alleviation, and she died in Beijing on 13 October 2006.

== Honors ==
- Star of the Republic of Indonesia, 1st Class (Indonesia, 14 June 1961)

Liu's writings, including On the Self-Cultivation of Communist Party Members and his report on land reform, were published in the two-volume Selected Works of Liu Shaoqi (1982 and 1985). From 1987, his portrait appeared, alongside those of Mao, Zhou Enlai, and Zhu De, on the fourth series 100-yuan renminbi banknote. His birthplace in Huaminglou was restored in 1988 and is a nationally protected cultural relic, and the site of his death in Kaifeng became a provincial heritage site in 2000. A cement plant in Cambodia's Kampot Province bears his name.

== Works ==
=== Major works ===
- On the Self-Cultivation of Communist Party Members (1939)
- On Inner-Party Struggle (1941)
- On the Party (1945), the report on revising the party constitution at the 7th Party Congress
- Political report to the 8th Party Congress (1956)
- Report to the enlarged Central Work Conference (1962), delivered at the Seven Thousand Cadres Conference

=== Collections ===
- Liu Shaoqi (1981–1985). 刘少奇选集 [Selected Works of Liu Shaoqi] (in Chinese). Vol. 2 vols. Beijing: People's Publishing House.
- Liu Shaoqi (2005–2018). 建国以来刘少奇文稿 [Manuscripts of Liu Shaoqi since the Founding of the People's Republic] (in Chinese). Vol. 12 vols. Beijing: Central Party Literature Press.
- Liu Shaoqi (1984). Selected Works of Liu Shaoqi. Vol. I (1st ed.). Beijing: Foreign Languages Press. ISBN 0-8351-1180-6. Archived from the original on 6 December 2020.
- — (1991). Selected Works of Liu Shaoqi. Vol. II (1st ed.). Beijing: Foreign Languages Press. ISBN 0-8351-2452-5. Archived from the original on 6 December 2020.

== See also ==
- History of the People's Republic of China
- Former Residence of Liu Shaoqi

Assembly seats
| New title | Chairman of the Standing Committee of the National People's Congress; 1954–1959 | Succeeded by Zhu De |
Political offices
| Preceded by Mao Zedong | Chairman of China; 1959–1968 | Succeeded by Dong Biwu and Soong Ching-ling (acting) |
Party political offices
| Preceded by Mao Zedong | President of the Central Party School; 1947–1953 | Succeeded by Kai Feng |
| New title | Vice Chairman of the Chinese Communist Party; Served alongside: Zhou Enlai, Zhu De, Chen Yun, Lin Biao; 1956–1966 | Succeeded by Lin Biao |
