= Yan Liu (geographer) =

Australian geographer

Yan Liu is an Australian geographer known for her use of cellular automata and particle systems to model patterns of urban development. Her work has also involved using electronic transit pass data to compare the transportation patterns of residents of Australian and Chinese cities.

Liu has a Ph.D. from the University of Queensland, and an associate professor of human geography and deputy head of school in the University of Queensland School of Earth and Environmental Sciences. She is the author of the book Modelling urban development with geographical information systems and cellular automata (CRC Press, 2009).
