= Cai Dongfan =

Chinese historian and novelist (1877-1945)

- Born: July 23, 1877; Xiaoshan, Hangzhou, Zhejiang, Qing dynasty, China
- Died: 5 March 1945 (aged 67); Zhuji, Shaoxing, Zhejiang, Republic of China
- Occupations: historian, novelist
- Writing career
- Language: Chinese
- Genre: Historical fiction

Cai Dongfan (Chinese: 蔡东藩; Wade–Giles: Ts'ai Tung-fan; July 23, 1877 – March 5, 1945) was a Chinese historian and prolific writer of historical novels.

== Life ==
Cai was best known for writing of The Popular Romance of Dynasties from 1915 to 1926. This novel contains history of the Qin dynasty to 1920s in China. After writing, he became a doctor. During the Second Sino-Japanese War, he lived in exile.

== Personal life ==
Before the end of the Second Sino-Japanese War, on 5 March 1945, Cai died in Zhuji, China.

== List of works ==
- The Popular Romance of Dynasties (历朝通俗演义)
  - The Popular Romance of the Early Han Dynasty (前汉通俗演义)
  - The Popular Romance of the Later Han Dynasty (后汉通俗演义)
  - The Popular Romance of Two Jin Dynasties (两晋通俗演义)
  - The Popular Romance of the Southern and Northern Dynasties (南北朝通俗演义)
  - The Popular Romance of Tang Dynasty (唐史通俗演义)
  - The Popular Romance of the Five Dynasties (五代史通俗演义)
  - The Popular Romance of Song Dynasty (宋史通俗演义)
  - The Popular Romance of Yuan Dynasty (元史通俗演义)
  - The Popular Romance of Ming Dynasty (明史通俗演义)
  - The Popular Romance of Qing Dynasty (清史通俗演义)
  - The Popular Romance of the Republic of China (民国史通俗演义)
- The Romance of Empress Dowager Cixi (西太后演义)
