= Liu Yan (scientist) =

Chinese Antarctic researcher

- 刘岩
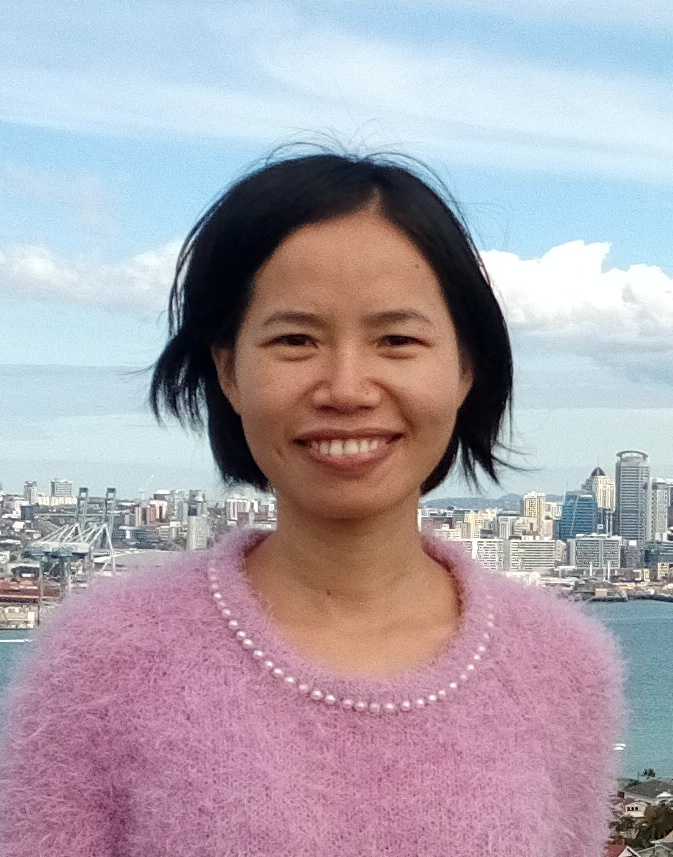
- Liu in 2014
- Education: Wuhan University (BSc); Chinese Academy of Sciences (MSc); Beijing Normal University (PhD)
- Scientific career
- Fields: Remote sensing
- Workplaces: Beijing Normal University
- Website: Liu Yan on Beijing Normal University

Liu Yan (Chinese: 刘岩) is a Chinese Antarctic researcher best known for her work on iceberg calving. She is an associate professor of geography in the College of Global Change and Earth System Science (GCESS) and Polar Research Institute, Beijing Normal University.

== Early life and education ==
Liu received her B.Sc., as an outstanding graduate, in photogrammetry and remote sensing from Wuhan University in 2003, her M.Sc. in cartography and geographical information system from the Institute of Remote Sensing Application, Chinese Academy of Sciences in 2006, and her Ph.D. in global environmental change from Beijing Normal University in 2013. She carried out post-doctoral research work at the GCESS between 2013 and 2015 and took charge of NSFC project: Mass balance and its change of Antarctic ice shelves in 2014.

== Career and impact ==
Liu began her Antarctic research in 2009 after working as a technical manager in the field of remote sensing applications for three years. Her research focuses on ice shelves in Antarctica and their responses to climate change. She uses a combination of satellite radar and altimetry and other remote sensed data to understand ice shelf dynamic processes. She is known for high impact research into Antarctic ice shelf mass loss, especially iceberg calving and basal melting. She published the dataset of Antarctic iceberg calving in Chinese National Arctic and Antarctic Data Center.

Liu is one of core members of Xiao Cheng's polar remote sensing research group at Beijing Normal University. This group has used remote sensed data to contribution extensively to Antarctic land cover mapping and to provide the monitoring and supporting for navigation of Xue Long icebreaker in the Chinese Antarctic expeditions since 2011. They provided the efficient data for XUELONG icebreaker successfully getting out of the trouble after Antarctica rescue in January 2014.

Liu's work on iceberg calving and ice shelf retreat in Antarctica used satellite images to measure all icebergs larger than 1 km^{2} calving from the entire Antarctic coastline, and the state of health of all the ice shelves. Some large ice shelves are growing while many smaller ice shelves are shrinking. They found high rates of iceberg calving from Antarctic ice shelves that are undergoing basal melt-induced thinning, which suggests the fate of ice shelves may be more sensitive to ocean forcing than was previously thought.
