= Akamonue Kofun =

Kofun period keyhole-shaped burial mound in Shizuoka, Japan

- 赤門上古墳 (Japanese)
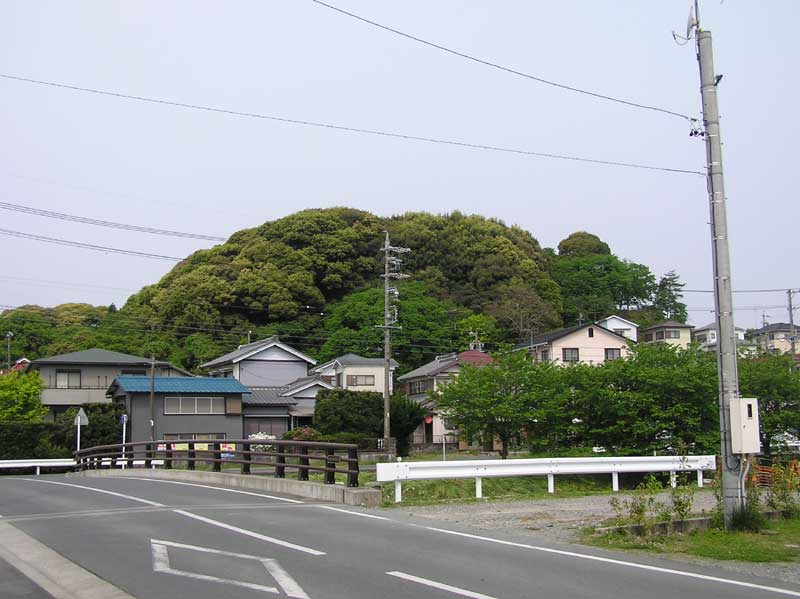
- Akamonue Kofun

- Akamonue Kofun Akamonue Kofun (Japan)
- 34°47′18″N 137°45′10″E
- Type: Kofun
- Periods: Kofun period
- Location: Hamana-ku, Hamamatsu, Shizuoka, Japan
- Region: Tōkai region

History
- Built: late 4th century

Site notes
- Public access: Yes (no facilities)
- Shizuoka Prefecture Historic Site

Akamonue Kofun (赤門上古墳) is an early Kofun period (late 4th century) keyhole-shaped burial mound, located in the Uchinō neighborhood of Hamana-ku, Hamamatsu, Shizuoka in the Tōkai region of Japan. The tumulus was designated a Shizuoka Prefecture Historic Site in 1979.

== Overview ==
The Akamonue Kofun is a zenpō-kōen-fun (前方後円墳), which is shaped like a keyhole, having one square end and one circular end, when viewed from above. It is located at an elevation of 35 meters on the eastern edge of the Mikatagahara Plateau, Iwatabara Plateau located east of the Tenryū River. It is now surrounded by a suburban residential development. The name of the burial mound originates from the temple of Ryūsen-in (commonly known as "Akamon-ji"), located south of the mound. Several hundred meters northeast of Akamonyama Kofun are the Inariyama Kofun and Yamanoue Kofun (both unexcavated), and several other burial mounds remain in the surrounding area.

The tumulus is 56.3 meters long, with a posterior circular section of 36.2 meters in diameter and 4.9 meters high, and an anterior rectangular section 14.7 meters wide and 1.15 meters high, orientated to the north. The front rectangular section is low and narrow, a characteristic of older keyhole-shaped tumuli. It was excavated in 1961, although portions of the mound had been damaged due to the construction of air raid shelters during wartime. Although there was evidence of pre-modern grave robbing, the direct earth burial in the posterior circular mound was intact, and a split-bamboo-shaped camphor wood coffin measuring 5.58 meters in length was discovered. It was constructed from a large tree over one meter in diameter that had been cut lengthwise. Clay was scattered in a U-shape at the northern end of the coffin, possibly to support it, and the inside of the coffin was painted vermilion.

The grave goods included numerous metal artifacts, including a triangular-rimmed shinju-kyo bronze mirror with a floral crest, sun, moon, heavenly king, and four beasts motif; one iron sword; one straight sword; six tubular jasper beads; 30 bronze arrowheads; 11 iron arrowheads; three iron axe heads; two spearheads; one knife; and two unidentified iron artifacts. Identical triangular-rimmed bronze mirrors have been found in Tsubai Ōtsukayama Kofun in Kyoto Prefecture, the Samida Takarazuka Kofun in Nara Prefecture, the Yoshijima Kofun in Hyogo Prefecture, and the Yukinoyama Kofun in Shiga Prefecture, suggesting that the person buried in the Akamonuei Kofun had connections to the Kinai region. The "Triangular-rimmed Divine Beast Mirrors" are described in the Chinese chronicle Wei zhi (魏志 "Records of Wei"), which is part of the Records of the Three Kingdoms (三國志). Per this record, in the year 239 AD Emperor Cao Rui sent "one hundred bronze mirrors" to Queen Himiko of Wa, and mirrors of this design, was subsequently manufactured in Japan within a short period of time afterwards.

The excavated artifacts were collectively designated a Shizuoka Prefecture Tangible Cultural Property in 1990, and some are on display at the Hamakita Citizens' Museum within the Hamakita Cultural Center in Hamamatsu City.

Total length
56.3 meters:
Anterior rectangular portion
14.7 meters wide x 1.15 meters high
Posterior circular portion
36.2 meter diameter x 4/9 meters high

== Gallery ==
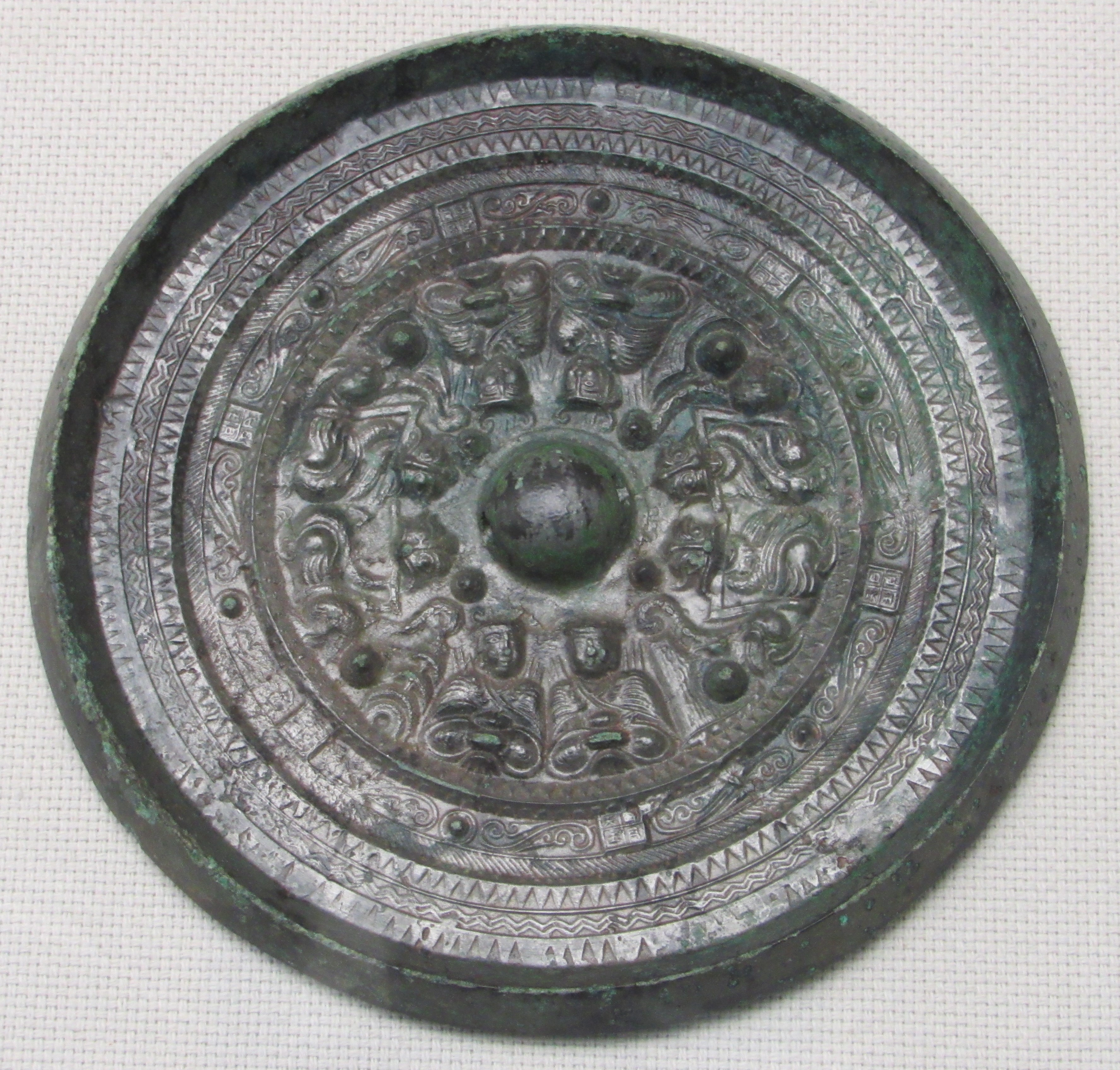
Bronze mirror excavated from the Akamonue Kofun

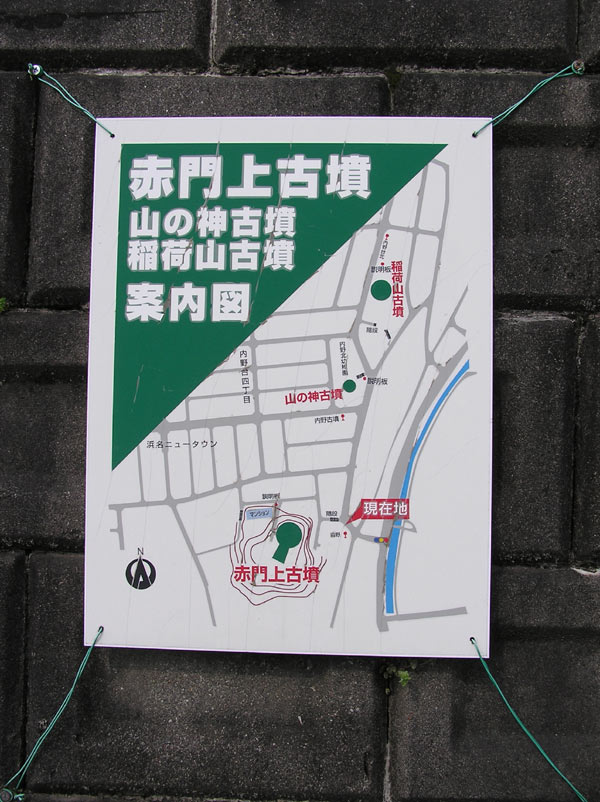
Location map

== See also ==
- List of Historic Sites of Japan (Shizuoka)
