= Tsubai Ōtsukayama Kofun =

Kofun period burial mound in Kyoto, Japan

- 椿井大塚山古墳 (Japanese)
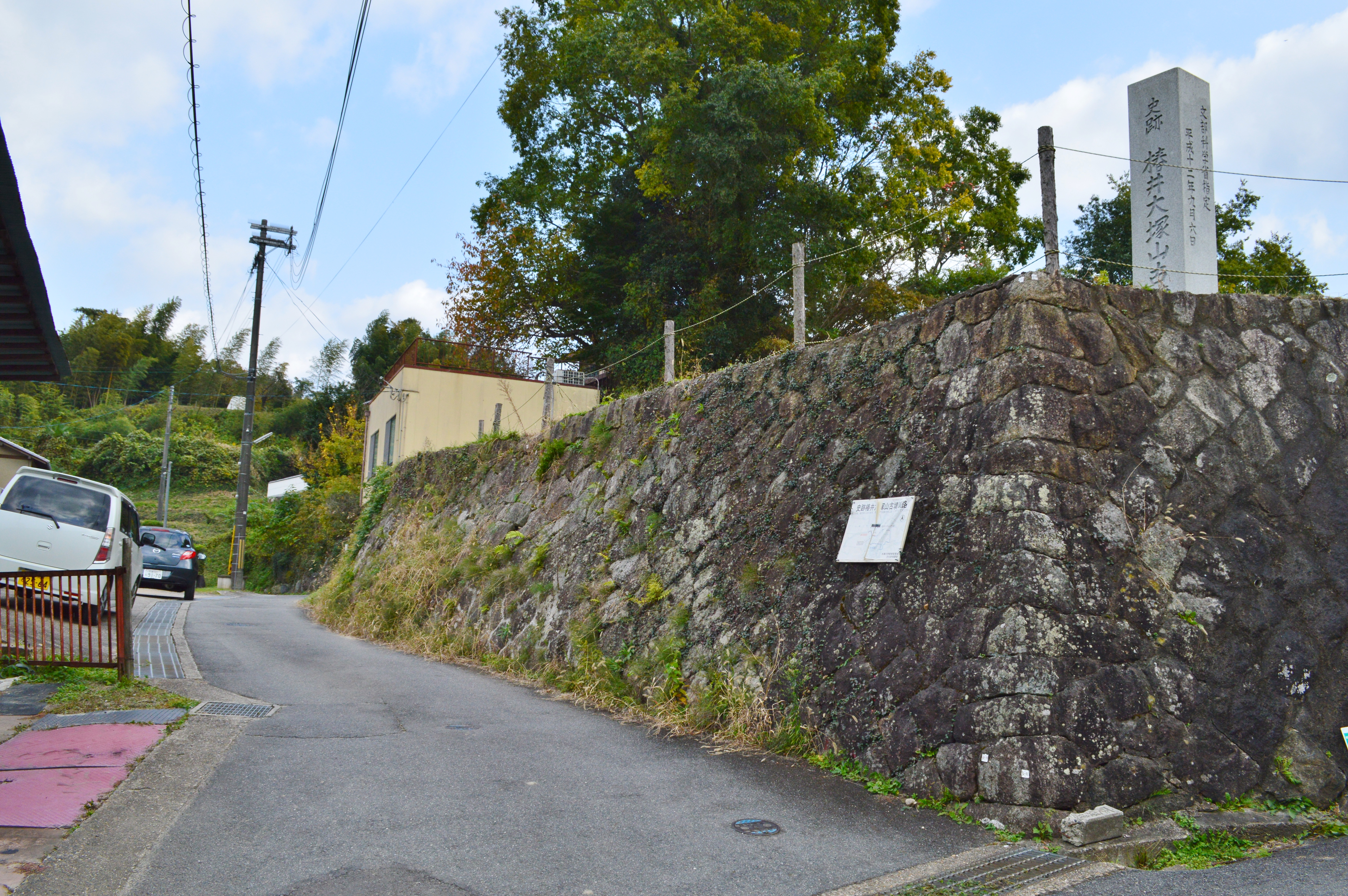
- Tsubai Ōtsukayama Kofun

- Tsubai Ōtsukayama Kofun Tsubai Ōtsukayama Kofun (Japan)
- Interactive map of Tsubai Ōtsukayama Kofun
- 34°45′43.7″N 135°49′4.0″E
- Type: Kofun
- Periods: Kofun period
- Location: Kizugawa, Kyoto, Japan
- Region: Kansai region

History
- Built: c.3rd century

Site notes
- Public access: Yes (no facilities)

Tsubai Ōtsukayama Kofun (椿井大塚山古墳) is a Kofun period keyhole-shaped burial mound, located in the Yamashiro neighborhood of the city of Kizugawa, Kyoto in the Kansai region of Japan. The tumulus was designated a National Historic Site of Japan in 2008. It is noted for the bronze mirrors which were found within. These artifacts are collectively designated a National Important Cultural Property.

== Overview ==
The Tsubai Ōtsukayama Kofun is a zenpō-kōen-fun (前方後円墳), which is shaped like a keyhole, having one square end and one circular end, when viewed from above. It is located at the end of a 60-meter hill approximately two kilometers north of where the Kizu River enters the plains of southern Yamashiro and turns north. In 1894, when the Nara Railway (now JR West Nara Line) track was being laid, the front of the posterior circular section of the tumulus was truncated, and in 1953, when the track was being widened during maintenance work, part of the tomb collapsed due to heavy rain, and a stone burial chamber was uncovered. This left the posterior portion with a semicircular shape, now covered in a bamboo forest. The anterior rectangular portion of the tumulus was also partially leveled, and private residences were constructed on the site. There is a cut approximately 15 meters wide to separate the hill from the east, and it appears to be the remnants of a surrounding moat. The total length of the tumulus is estimated to have been around 180 meters, and the posterior circular portion originally had a diameter of over 70 meters.

The burial chamber is a stylized pit-style stone chamber measuring 6.9 meters long from north-to-south, one meter wide, and three meters high.The walls are made of slabs and split stones, and the ceiling is also covered with slabs and thickly covered with clay. The floor is laid with flagstones, gravel, and sand, covered with clay, and contained long split bamboo-shaped wooden coffin. The interior of the stone chamber was painted vermilion, and the clay floor was sprinkled with more than 10 kilograms of cinnabar. Archaeological excavation of the burial chamber found 40 bronze mirrors, more than 30 of which were "Triangular-rimmed Divine Beast Mirrors" as described in the Chinese chronicle Wei zhi (魏志 "Records of Wei"), which is part of the Records of the Three Kingdoms (三國志). Per this record, in the year 239 AD Emperor Cao Rui sent "one hundred bronze mirrors" to Queen Himiko of Wa, and as the tumulus dates from the late 3rd century, it is speculated that the mirrors excavated from this tomb correspond to some a portion of these mirrors; however, later investigation divided these mirrors into six designs, which were manufactured in Japan in almost the same place and area within a short period of time. There was also a possibility that the tomb contained more mirrors which have now gone missing due to grave theft

Other artifacts included more than 10 iron swords, seven iron spears, about 200 iron arrowheads, 17 bronze arrowheads, and one piece of iron armor. As for tools and agricultural implements, there are 3 iron sickles, 10 iron axes, eight iron drills, and three iron chisels as well as ten iron harpoons, several iron fishing spears, and one iron fishhook. In addition, an iron product suspected to be an iron crown was found.

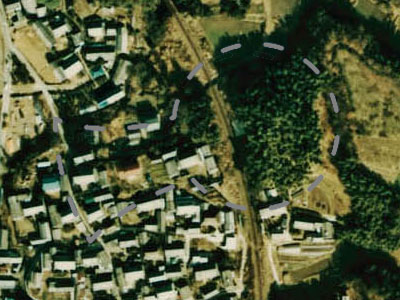
Aerial photograph

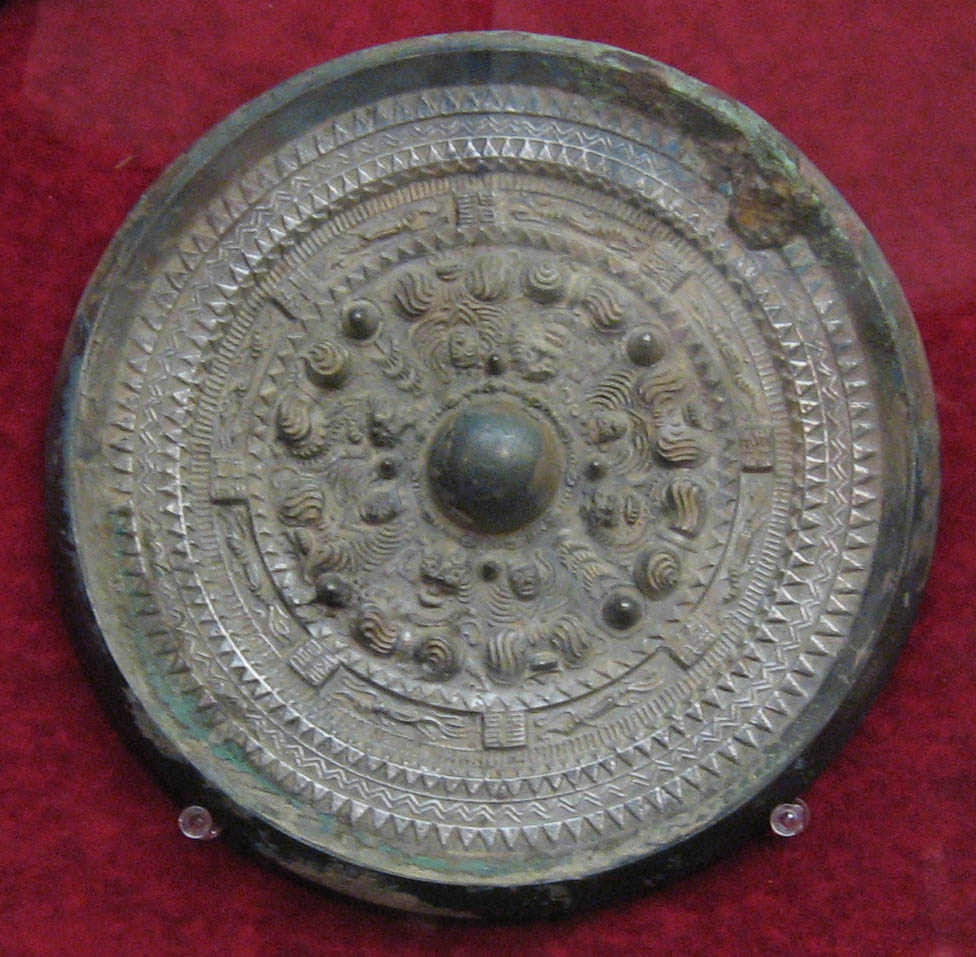
Bronze mirror from Tsubai Ōtsukayama Kofun

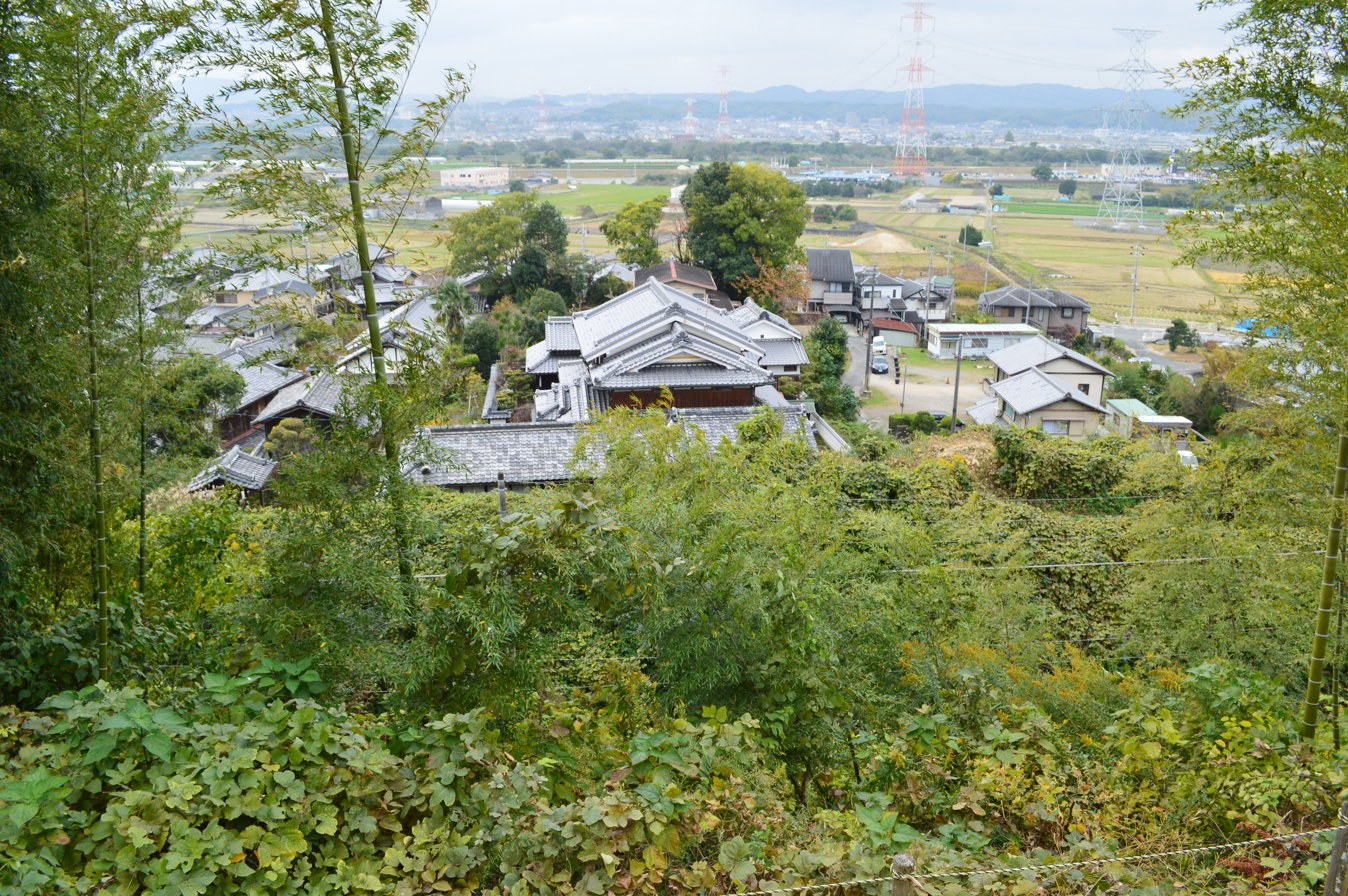
Posterior looking towards anterior

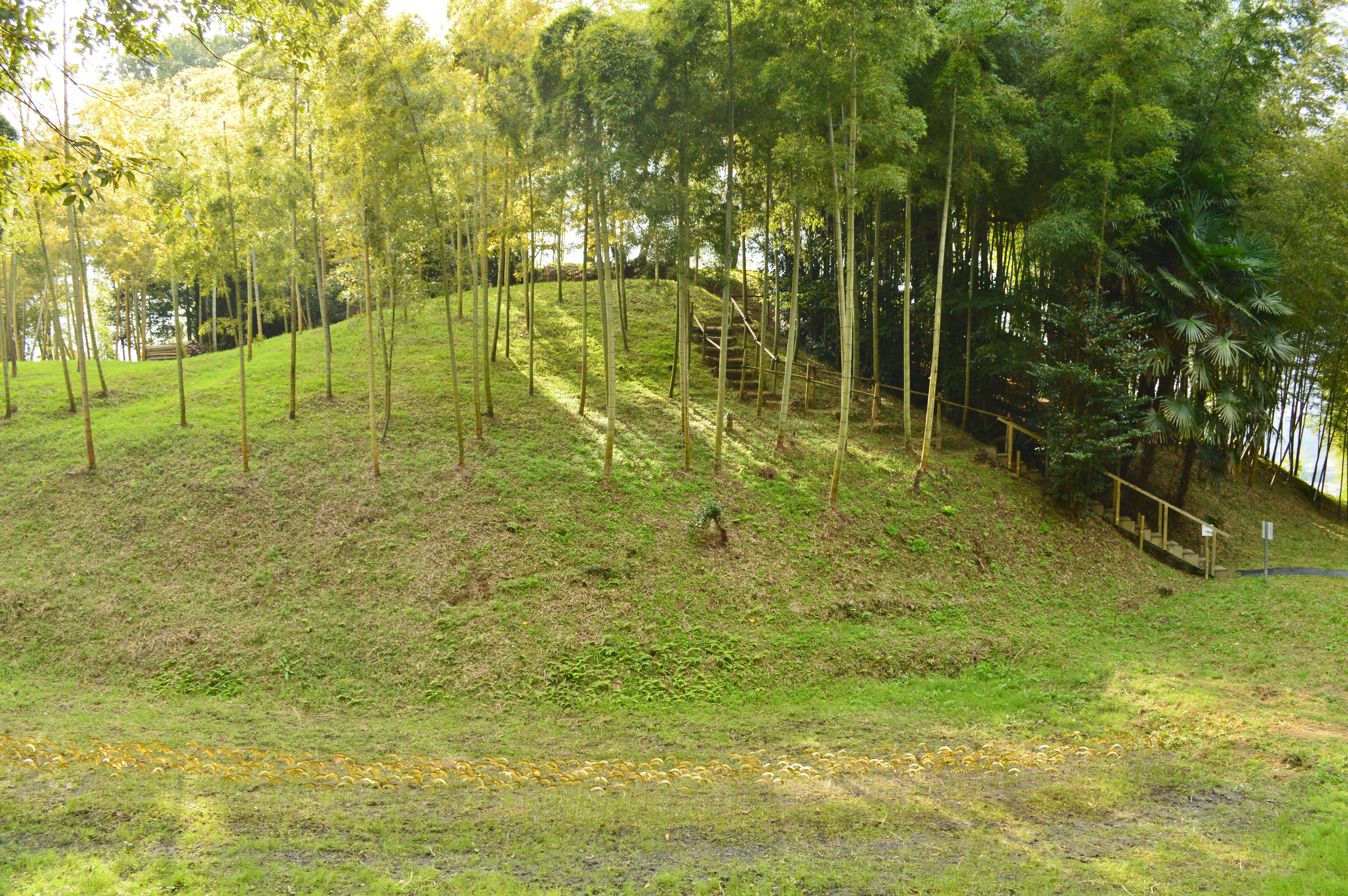
Posterior circular porton

The site is about 20 minutes walk from Kamikoma Station on the JR West Nara Line.

== See also ==
- List of Historic Sites of Japan (Kyoto)
