= TLV mirror =

Type of bronze mirror that was popular during the Han dynasty in China

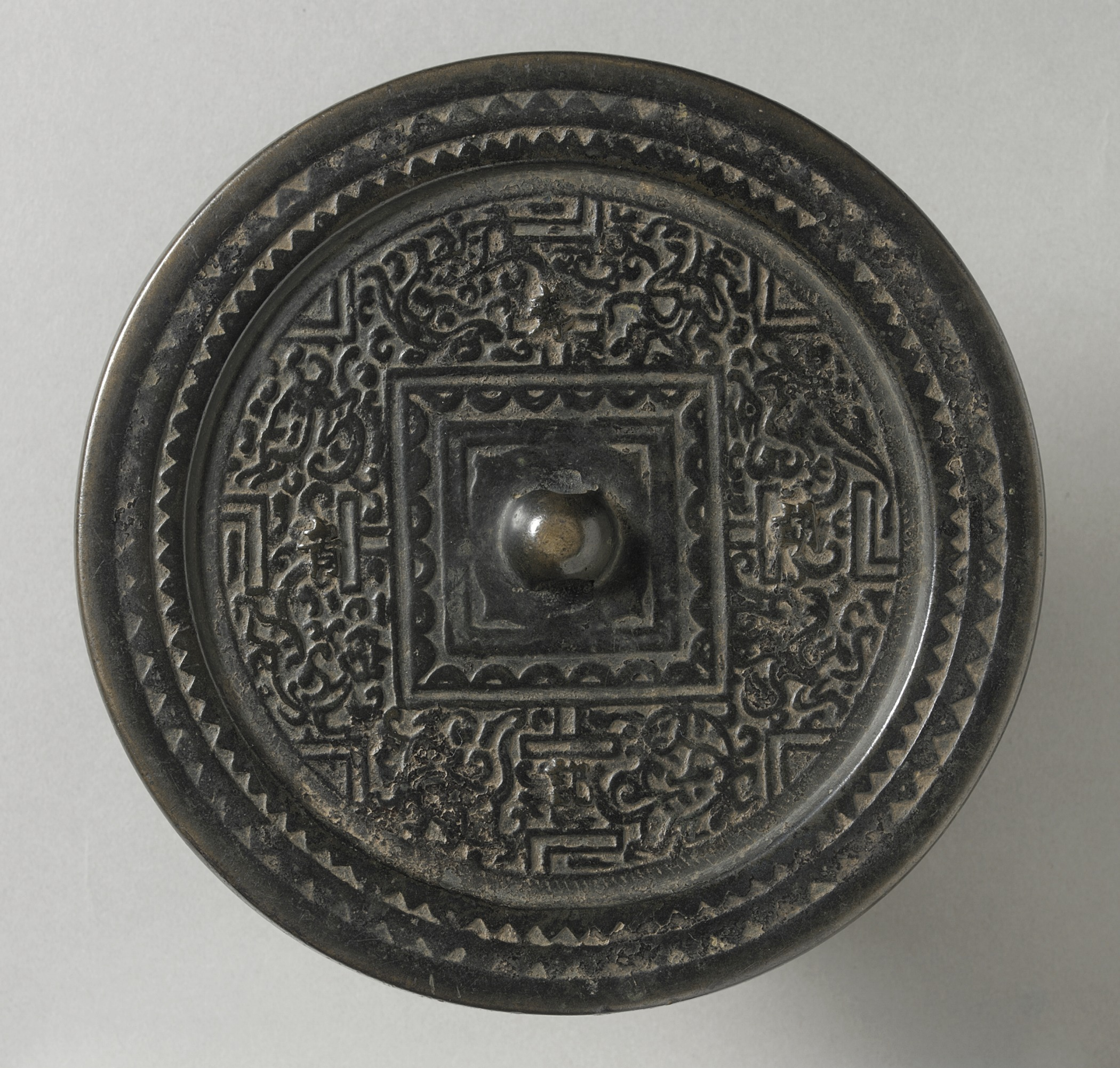
TLV mirror from the Eastern Han period

"TLV mirror" is the name given by archeologists to a type of bronze mirror that was popular during the Han dynasty in China. They are called TLV mirrors because symbols resembling the Latin letters "T," "L" and "V" are cast in the design. They were produced from around the 2nd century BCE until the 2nd century CE.

== Development ==
The first mirrors with TLV symbols appeared during the 2nd century BCE, with some believing that they were related to Liu An's astrological and cosmological interests. The dragon was an important symbol of these early TLV mirrors. In early mirrors from the 2nd century BCE, the dragons were often used as an arabesque, however by the 1st century BCE, the dragons lost their arabesque form and became full-fledged figures.

In the later part of the Western Han period, the dragons were replaced by winged figures, monsters and immortals. These new mirrors also saw the division of the main area into two separate rings, with the TLV symbols being placed in the inner part of the main area, and other decorations being placed in the outer area. By the end of the 1st century BCE, the band dividing the main area into two concentric rings had largely lost its structural function of separating the mirror into two sections. Instead it existed merely as a line, or not at all.

Mirrors from the Xin dynasty (8–23 CE) usually have an outer band with cloud or animal motifs, and an inner circle with a square containing a knob. The inner circle often contains a series of eight 'nipples,' and various mythological animals and being, often including the Queen Mother of the West. The central square could have an inscription, or contain the characters of the Twelve Earthly Branches. Inscriptions placed in between the mirror's sections frequently discuss Wang Mang and his reign.

== Symbolism ==
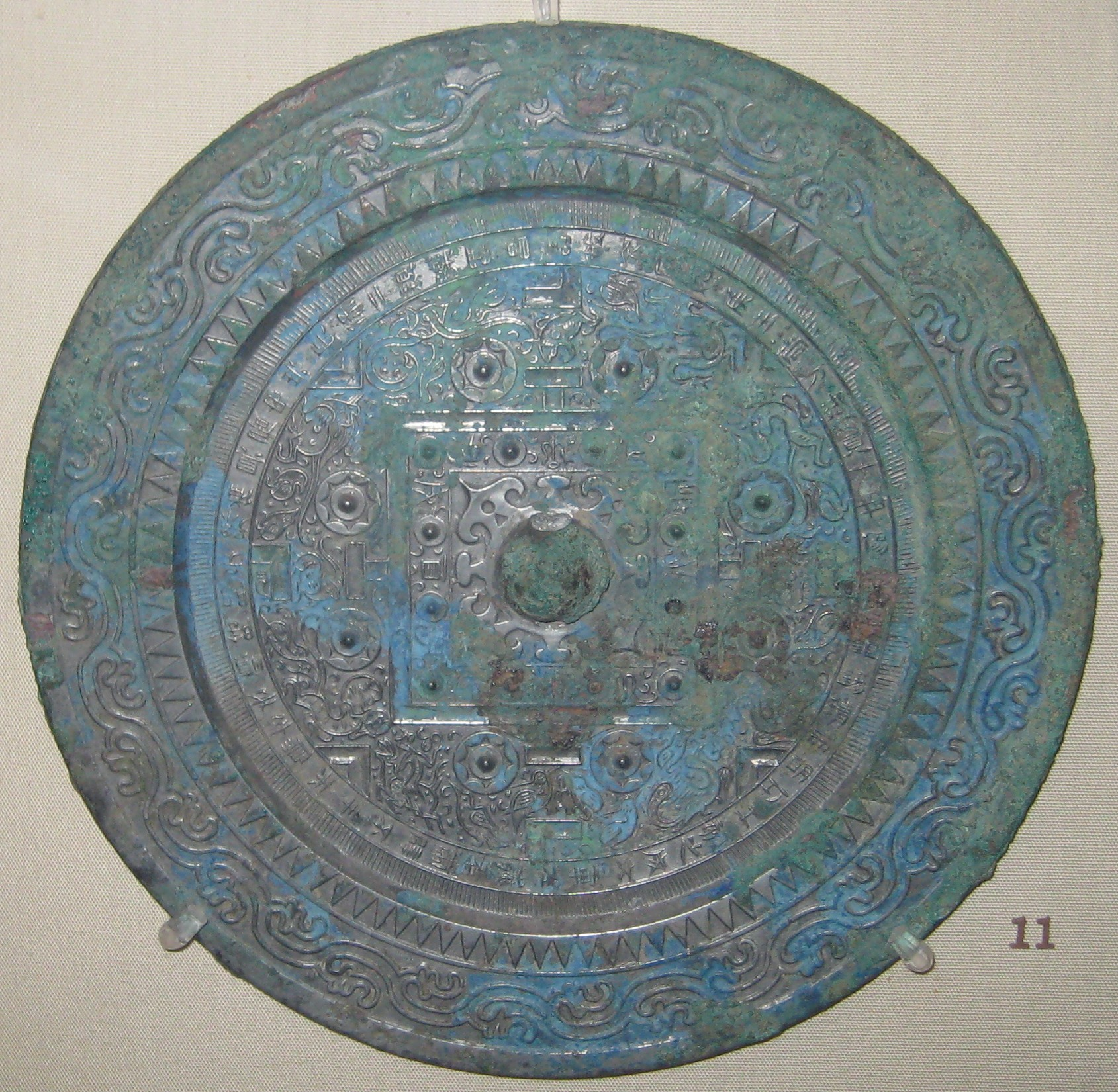
TLV mirror from the Han dynasty

Scholars are engaged in a debate as to what the symbols on TLV mirrors mean. Some scholars believe that they represent ideas from Chinese cosmology, while others believe that they could also be used to play the boardgame of liubo.

=== Cosmological significance ===
TLV mirrors are circular. At their centers is a circular boss inset on a square panel. According to Schuyler Camman, the design of TLV mirrors was cosmologically significant. The V shapes served to give the inner square the appearance of being placed in the middle of a cross. This forms an illustration of the Chinese idea of the five directions – North, South, West, East and Center. The central square represents China as the ‘Middle Kingdom.’ The area in between the central square and the circle represented the ‘Four Seas.’ During the Han dynasty the ‘Four Seas’ represented territories outside China, and did not literally refer to water. The central square within the round mirror likely alludes to the ancient Chinese idea that heaven was round and earth was square. The Ts represented the concept of the ‘Four Gates of the Middle Kingdom,’ an idea present in Chinese literature. They could have also represented the idea of the four inner gates of the Han place of sacrifice, or the gates of the imperial tombs built during the Han period. The Ls possibly symbolized the marshes and swamps beyond the ‘Four Seas,’ at the ends of the earth. The bending of the Ls could possibly have served to create a rotating effect which symbolized the four seasons, which were very closely related to the cardinal directions. The nine nipples in the central square likely represented the ‘nine regions of the earth as discussed by Cammann as having come from the Shiji. The eight nipples outside of the central square were most likely a representations of the Eight Pillars, mountains that held up the canopy of heaven. The area between the inner round border and the outer rim of the mirror was often filled with swirls that represented the clouds in heaven.

=== The game of liubo ===
In 1947 Professor Lien-sheng Yang of Harvard University proposed that the design of TLV mirrors was related to an ancient Chinese boardgame called liubo, which was played on a square board with the same markings as seen on this type of mirror. Further evidence was presented in an additional note in 1952. An ancient rubbing of a first century Chinese bronze mirror discovered in the National Museum of China in 1980s further confirms it.

== See also ==
- Mandala
- Chinese magic mirror
- Toli
- Shinju-kyo
