= Liubo =

Ancient Chinese board game for two players

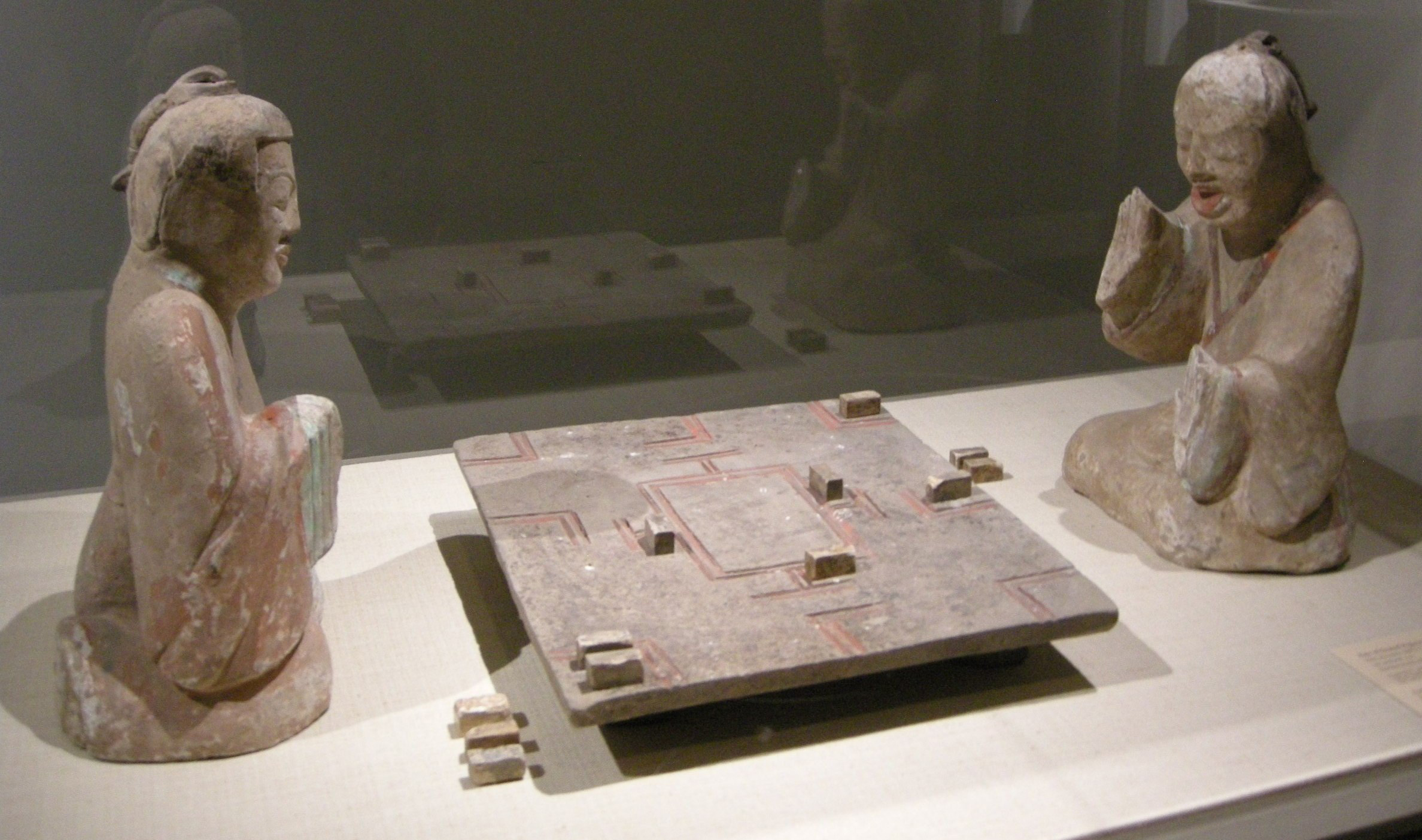
- A pair of Eastern Han dynasty (25–220 CE) ceramic tomb figurines of two gentlemen playing liubo
- Chinese: 六博
- Literal meaning: six sticks
Transcriptions
Standard Mandarin
- Hanyu Pinyin: liùbó
- Wade–Giles: liu^{4}-po^{2}
- IPA: [ljôʊpwǒ]
Yue: Cantonese
- Yale Romanization: luhkbok
- Jyutping: luk6bok3
- IPA: [lʊk̚˨.pɔk̚˧]
Middle Chinese
- Middle Chinese: /lɨuk̚.pwɑk̚/
Old Chinese
- Baxter–Sagart (2014): *kruk pˤak
- Zhengzhang: *ruɡ.paːɡ

Liubo (Chinese: 六博; Old Chinese *kruk pˤak “six sticks”) was an ancient Chinese board game for two players. The rules have largely been lost, but it is believed that each player had six game pieces that were moved around the points of a square game board that had a distinctive, symmetrical pattern. Moves were determined by the throw of six sticks, which performed the same function as dice in other race games.

The game was invented no later than the middle of the 1st millennium BCE, and was popular during the Han dynasty (202 BCE – 220 CE). However, after the Han dynasty it rapidly declined in popularity, possibly due to the rise in popularity of the game of weiqi (go), and it became totally forgotten.

Knowledge of the game has increased in recent years with archeological discoveries of Liubo game boards and game equipment in ancient tombs, as well as discoveries of Han dynasty picture stones and picture bricks depicting Liubo players.

== History ==
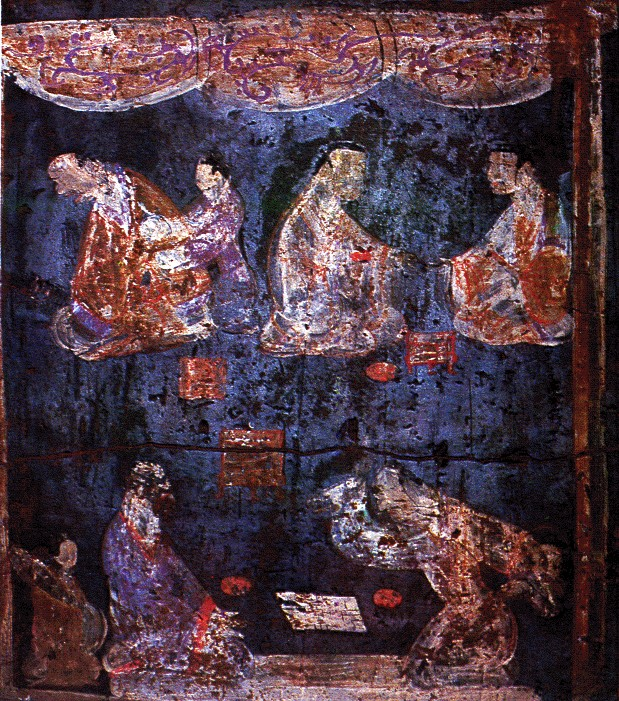
Mural from an Eastern Han dynasty tomb at Luoyang, Henan showing a pair of Liubo players in the foreground, the player on the right with his right hand raised up as if about to throw down the six throwing sticks

It is not known when the game of Liubo originated, although according to legend it was invented by Wu Cao (烏曹, called Wu Zhou 烏胄 in the early 2nd century CE Shuowen Jiezi dictionary), a minister to King Jie, the last king of the Xia dynasty, who according to traditional chronology reigned 1728–1675 BCE. While there is no archeological or reliable documentary evidence to support the view that Liubo dates back to the Shang dynasty (1600–1046 BCE), early Chinese records do indicate that Liubo was already a popular game by the Warring States period (476–221 BCE). For example, the Records of the Grand Historian records a speech made during the reign of King Xuan of Qi (reigned 319–301 BCE) that claims that the capital city of Linzi was so wealthy that its citizens were all able to indulge in activities such as playing musical instruments, cockfighting, dog racing, playing Liubo and playing kickball.

The game of Liubo is also described in the mid 3rd century BCE poem "Summons of the Soul" ("Zhao Hun" 招魂) in the Songs of Chu:

菎蔽象棋，有六簙些。
分曹並進，遒相迫些。
成梟而牟，呼五白些。

Then with bamboo dice and ivory pieces the game of Liu Bo is begun;
Sides are taken; they advance together; keenly they threaten each other.
Pieces are kinged and the scoring doubled. Shouts of ‘five white!’ arise.

Note that the line “Pieces are kinged” translates 成梟 chéng xiāo ”become an owl”. The earliest Liubo boards to have been discovered are a pair of ornately decorated stone boards from a 4th-century BCE tomb in the royal tomb complex of the State of Zhongshan at Pingshan in Hebei.

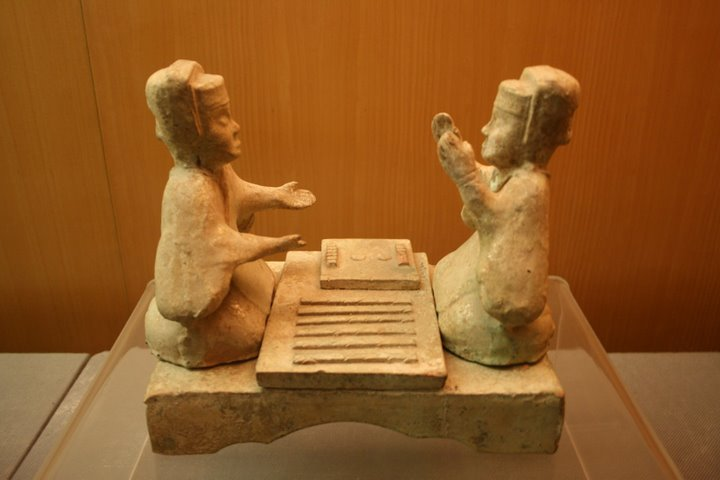
Eastern Han glazed pottery tomb figurines playing Liubo, with six sticks laid out to the side of the game board

The game reached its greatest popularity during the Han dynasty, as is evidenced by the discovery of many examples of Liubo boards or sets of Liubo game pieces as grave goods in high status tombs dating to the Han dynasty. Pottery or wooden figurines of players with model Liubo boards have also been discovered in some Han tombs. Engraved picture stones (畫像石) and moulded picture bricks (畫像磚) that were widely used to decorate tombs and temples during the Eastern Han period (25–220 CE) also frequently depict people playing Liubo, sometimes as a small part of a complex scene depicting many different activities, but sometimes as the focal point of the scene, with the players attended by servants and playing in the cool of a pavilion. Some picture stones and engravings on stone coffins, especially those from the area of modern Sichuan and Yunnan provinces, show two winged immortals playing Liubo on a mountain, usually as part of a larger scene depicting the Queen Mother of the West and various mythical animals.

After the end of the Han dynasty the game seems to have lost its popularity, and there are no known examples of Liubo funerary ware or depictions of Liubo playing later than the Jin dynasty (266–420). Although the game is still occasionally referred to in some historical sources and in poetry as late as the Tang dynasty (618–907), it seems that Liubo had been largely displaced by the game of Go. By the time of the Yuan dynasty (1271–1368) all knowledge of the game of Liubo had been lost, and it is only with the archeological discoveries of recent years that the game has become better known.

There is some evidence that Liubo had spread beyond China. The Old Book of Tang mentions that Tibetans enjoyed playing both the game of Go and Liubo, but although ancient Tibetan Go boards have been discovered, no examples of Tibetan Liubo boards are known. The Chinese version of the Mahayana Mahaparinirvana Sutra also mentions the playing of several games, including Liubo, which some have taken as evidence that Liubo was transmitted to India. However, to date no examples of Liubo boards have been found outside of China.

== Equipment ==
Liubo boards and game equipment are often found as grave goods in tombs from the Han dynasty. Various types and sizes of Liubo board have been unearthed, made from a variety of materials, including wood, lacquered wood, pottery, stone and bronze. Some of the boards are simple square slabs of stone or wood, but others are supported by knobs at the four corners, and some are built as tables with long legs. Regardless of their size or shape, the common feature of all Liubo boards is the distinctive pattern that is carved or painted on their surface:

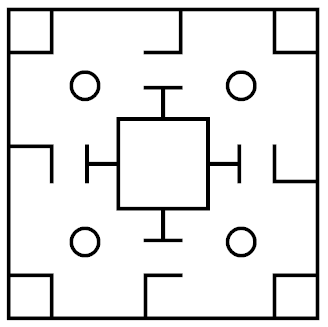

All excavated boards have the angular V-shaped marks at the corners and L-shaped marks at the center of the edges, as well as the central square and T-shaped protrusions, and most boards also have four marks (usually circular but sometimes a decorative pattern) between the corner mark and the central square. However, on some boards each circular mark is replaced by a straight line joining the corner mark to the corner of the inner square, and in a few cases there is no mark between the corner and the square at all.

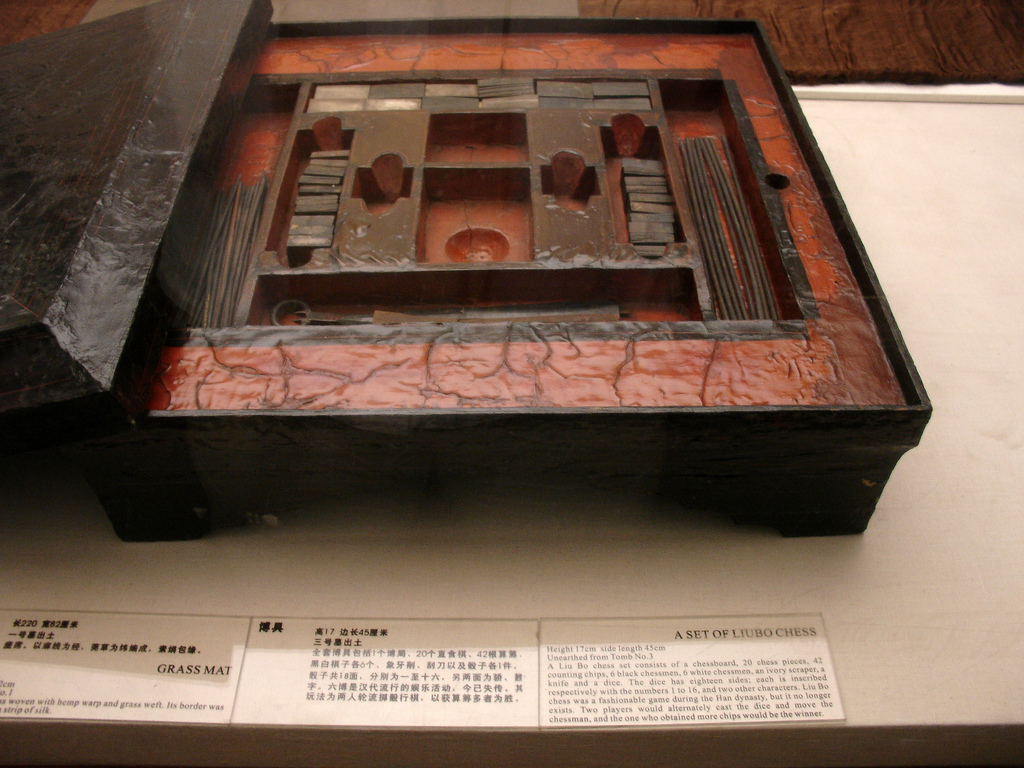
A lacquered Chinese liubo board game set excavated from Tomb No. 3 of Mawangdui site, Changsha, Hunan province, China, dated to the 2nd century BCE during the Western Han dynasty

In many tombs only the Liubo board has survived (especially if made of stone or bronze), and it can be assumed that any associated game pieces have decayed, whereas in other cases the game pieces (which are often made of ivory) have survived but the Liubo board (which is often made of wood or lacquer) has rotted away. However, in 1973 a unique, complete set of Liubo equipment in a lacquer box was discovered in a 2nd-century BCE tomb at Mawangdui (believed to be that of the son of the Marquis of Dai). This Liubo set comprises the following items (the Chinese description of the items in the inventory of grave goods that was found in the tomb are given in brackets):

- 1 lacquered wooden game box (45.0 × 45.0 × 17.0 cm.) [博一具]
- 1 lacquered wooden game board (45.0 × 45.0 × 1.2 cm.) [博局一]
- 12 cuboid ivory game pieces (4,2 × 2.2 × 2.3 cm.), six black and six white [象其十二]
- 20 ivory game pieces (2.9 × 1.7 × 1.0 cm.) [象直食其廿]
- 30 rod-shaped ivory counting chips (16.4 cm. long) [象筭三十枚]
- 12 ivory throwing rods (22.7 cm. long) [象□□□□ (last four characters obliterated)]
- 1 ivory knife (22.0 cm. long) [象割刀一]
- 1 ivory scraper (17.2 cm. long) [象削一]
- 1 eighteen-sided die with the numbers "1" through "16" and characters meaning "win" and "lose" [not listed in the inventory]

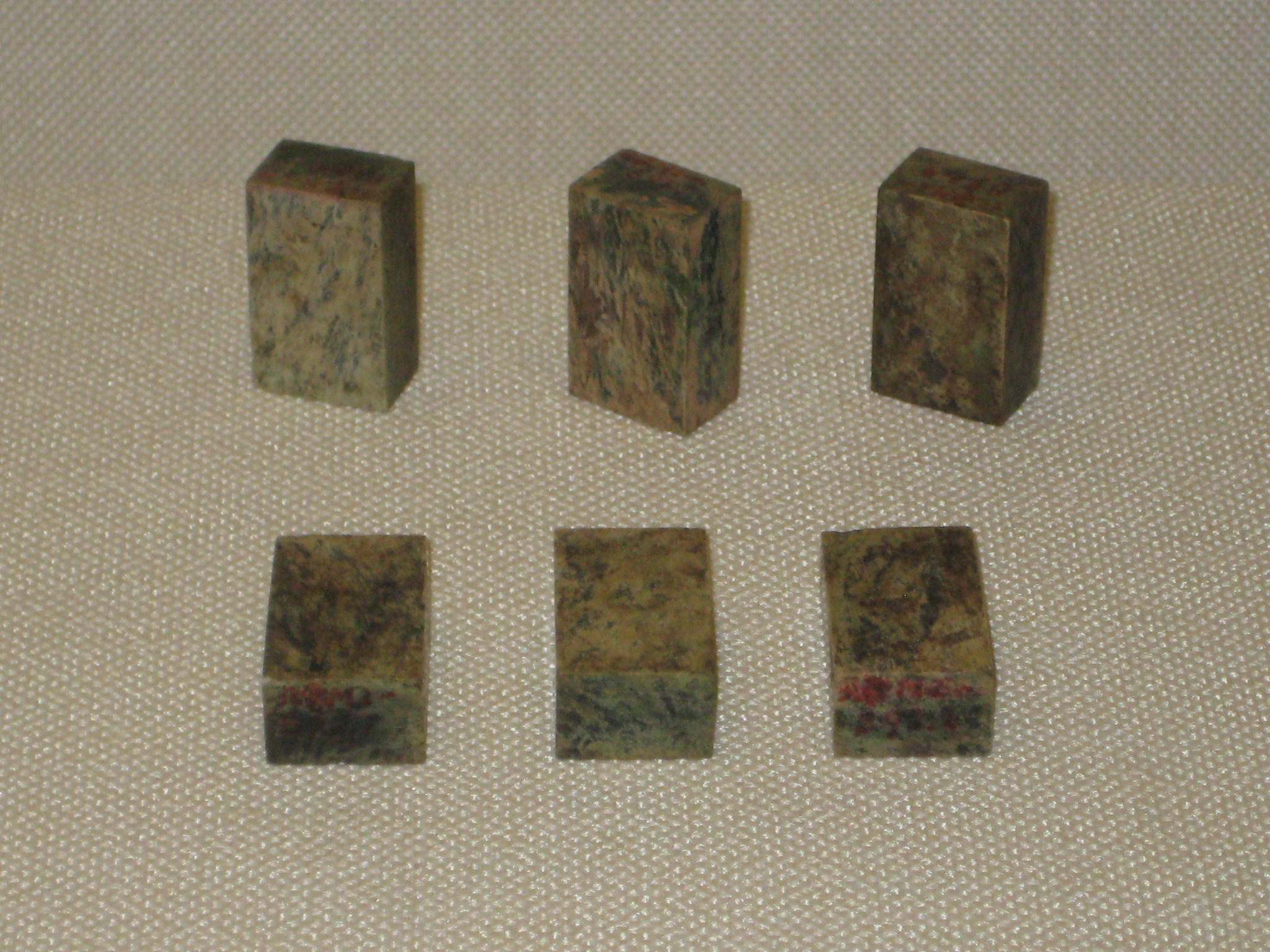
Six jadeite Liubo game pieces from the tomb of King Zhao Mo of Nanyue (reigned 137 BC – 122 BC)

The six black and six white game pieces are the main game pieces to be moved around the board, and similar sets of cubic or cuboid game pieces made from ivory, jadeite or rock crystal have been found in several other tombs. In at least one case the game pieces are not distinguished by colour, but by having an engraving of a tiger on the pieces of one set and an engraving of a dragon on the pieces of the other set. One game piece on each side is designated as a commander.

The twelve long rods are two sets of the six throwing sticks that the players use to determine their moves, and which the game is named after (Liubo="six sticks"). Most Han stone pictures of Liubo show the players throwing sticks onto a mat between themselves (with the Liubo board to the side of the mat), and ceramic model Liubo sets such as the one excavated in 1972 from Lingbao in Henan province show six sticks lined up neatly between the two players.

Sets of thirty rod-shaped counting chips have also been found in association with Liubo sets from other tombs.

However, the twenty ivory game pieces and the eighteen-sided die in the Mawangdui set are not typically associated with Liubo boards in other tombs, and it is possible that they were not used for playing Liubo, but were equipment for a different game. A similar eighteen-sided die with numbers "1" through "16", "win" and "take a drink" was found in association with two sets of twenty copper, coin-shaped tokens (one set inscribed "Number 1" through "Number 20", and the other set inscribed with three-character lines of poetry) in a Han tomb at Mancheng County in Hebei. No Liubo board or Liubo game pieces were found in the tomb, and because of the inscription "take a drink" (酒來) on one face of the die, the die and sets of tokens are supposed to have been used for a drinking game.

== Rules ==
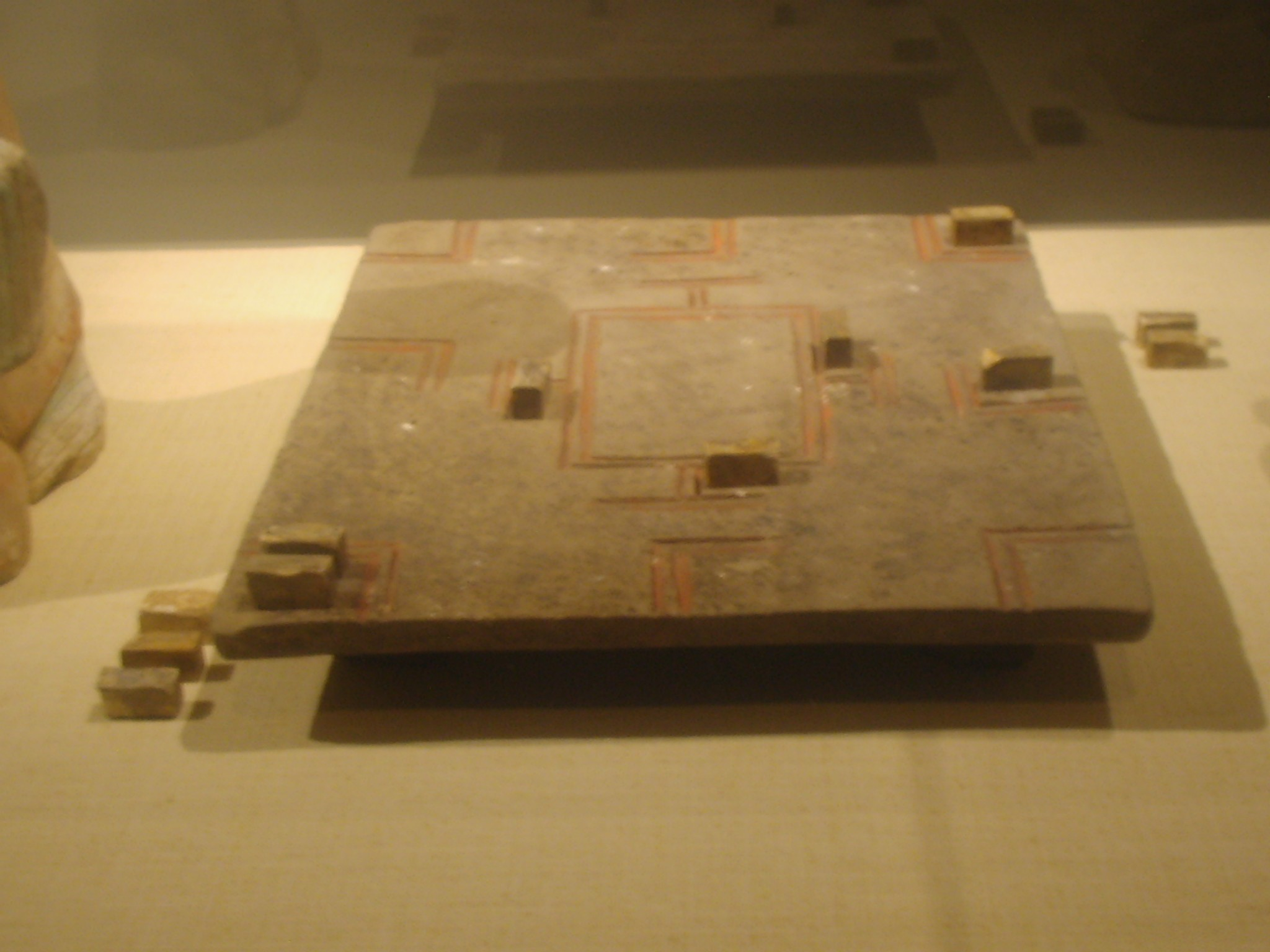
A close-up view of the board game with game pieces from the Eastern Han tomb model set

The exact rules of the game of Liubo are not known, and some of the surviving descriptions of the game are conflicting, which suggests that the game may have been played according to different rules at different times or in different places. The most complete description of the rules of Liubo occurs in a quotation from the lost Book of Ancient Bo (古博經) in a commentary by Zhang Zhan (張湛) to the Book of Liezi that was written during the Jin dynasty (266–420):

Method of play: Two people sit facing each other over a board, and the board is divided into twelve paths, with two ends, and an area called the "water" in the middle. Twelve game pieces are used, which according to the ancient rules are six white and six black. There are also two "fish" pieces, which are placed in the water. The throwing of the dice is done with a jade. The two players take turns to throw the dice and move their pieces. When a piece has been moved to a certain place it is stood up on end, and called an "owl (梟or驍) ". Thereupon it can enter the water and eat a fish, which is also called "pulling a fish". Every time a player pulls a fish he gets two tokens, and if he pulls two fish in a row he gets three tokens [for the second fish]. If a player has already pulled two fish but does not win it is called double-pulling a pair of fish. When one player wins six tokens the game is won.

Another, somewhat later source, The Family Instructions of Master Yan by Yan Zhitui (531–591) states that there were two variants of Liubo, "Greater Bo" (大博) which was played with six throwing sticks, and "Lesser Bo" (小博) which was played with two dice:

The ancient Greater Bo used six sticks, whereas Lesser Bo used two dice. Nowadays there is no-one who knows how to play, but in those days when it was played it used one die and twelve game pieces. It had very little skill, and was not worth playing.

Most game historians think that Liubo was a race game, and that players moved their six games pieces around the marks on the board. However, others consider Liubo to have been a battle game played with dice or throwing sticks.

There have been several attempts to reconstruct the rules of the game, most notably by Lien-sheng Yang, who discusses the game as it was possibly played on TLV mirrors. Yang theorizes that a player's piece would start on an L-shaped mark and try to move to a V-shaped corner mark depending on the throw of the sticks. Certain throws would allow a player's piece to move into the center and ‘kill’ the opponent's piece if it was already there. Once in the center, a piece could begin to block the enemy's pieces from taking a square. For each block one would gain two points. One could also attempt to recover one's pieces after they are blocked, and would gain three points for doing this. If one failed to win after having blocked two men, then the opponent would gain six points and win the game. The first player to six points would win the game. Jean-Louis Cazaux has reconstructed similar rules for playing Liubo. An implementation of these reconstructed rules as a playable computer game has also been attempted.

In 2019, more than 1,000 bamboo slips containing the rules for Liubo were discovered in the tomb of the Marquis of Haihun.

== Chupu ==
A variant of Liubo in which dice were used to make the moves was called Chupu (樗蒲) or Wumu (五木). In Korea the traditional game of jeopo (Korean: 저포; Hanja: 樗蒲) is still played, on a board that is not similar to a Liubo board.

== Relationship to other games ==
Some scholars associate Liubo to other board games, and in particular some Chinese scholars believe that Xiangqi (Chinese chess) was based on Liubo. Some historians believe that Xiangqi is not related to Persian chess, but was based on Liubo, whereas others have suggested that Liubo was transmitted from China to India during the Eastern Jin (317–420), where it developed into Chaturanga, which was the ancestor to both Persian chess and Chinese chess. Jean-Louis Cazaux has argued that Chinese chess could have been the result of hybridization between Indian or Persian chess and Liubo, which could have been transformed from a race game to a battle game. However, most game historians believe that Xiangqi originates from Indian or Persian chess and reject the claim that Xiangqi or other chess variants derive from Liubo. In a more recent publication, Cazaux opines that both the hypotheses of an Indian, Persian or Chinese origin of chess have some plausibility.

== Liubo patterns on other objects ==
=== Mirrors ===
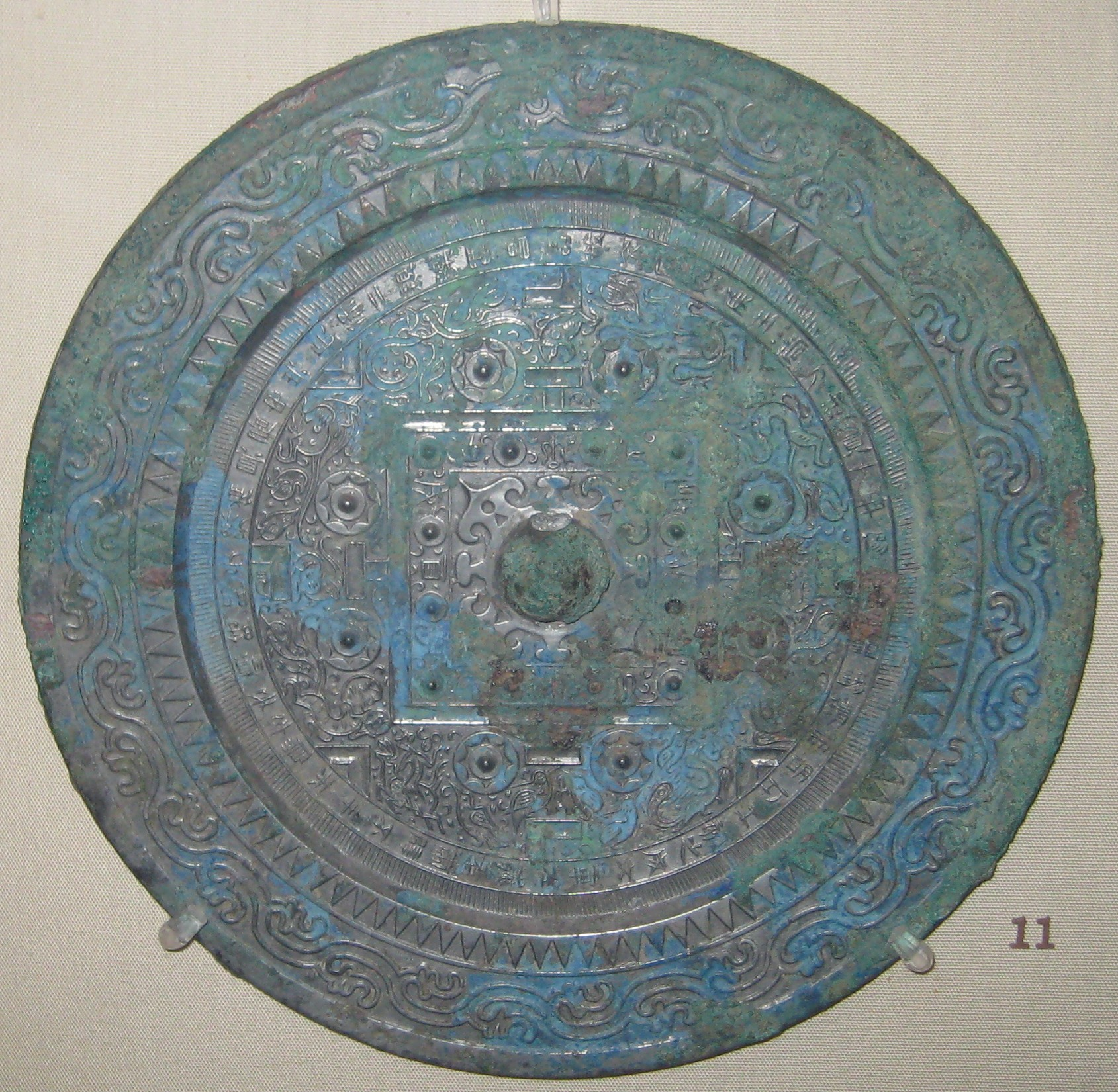
Han dynasty bronze mirror with TLV pattern

The pattern found on the surface of Liubo boards is also found on the most common type of Han dynasty bronze mirror, known from their distinctive markings as TLV mirrors. There is some debate over whether the Liubo pattern on these mirrors was simply decorative, or whether it had a ritual significance, or whether perhaps the mirrors doubled as portable Liubo game boards. Zhou Zheng has pointed out that one TLV mirror dating to the reign of Wang Mang (9–23) has an inscription that includes the words "Carved with a Liubo board pattern to dispel misfortune" (刻具博局去[祛]不羊[祥]), which suggests that the main purpose of the Liubo pattern on mirrors was ritual, and that the pattern had a special significance beyond game-playing.

=== Coins ===
The Liubo pattern is also sometimes found on the reverse of Wu Zhu coins. Such coins were not used as currency but were probably lucky charms.

=== Sundials ===
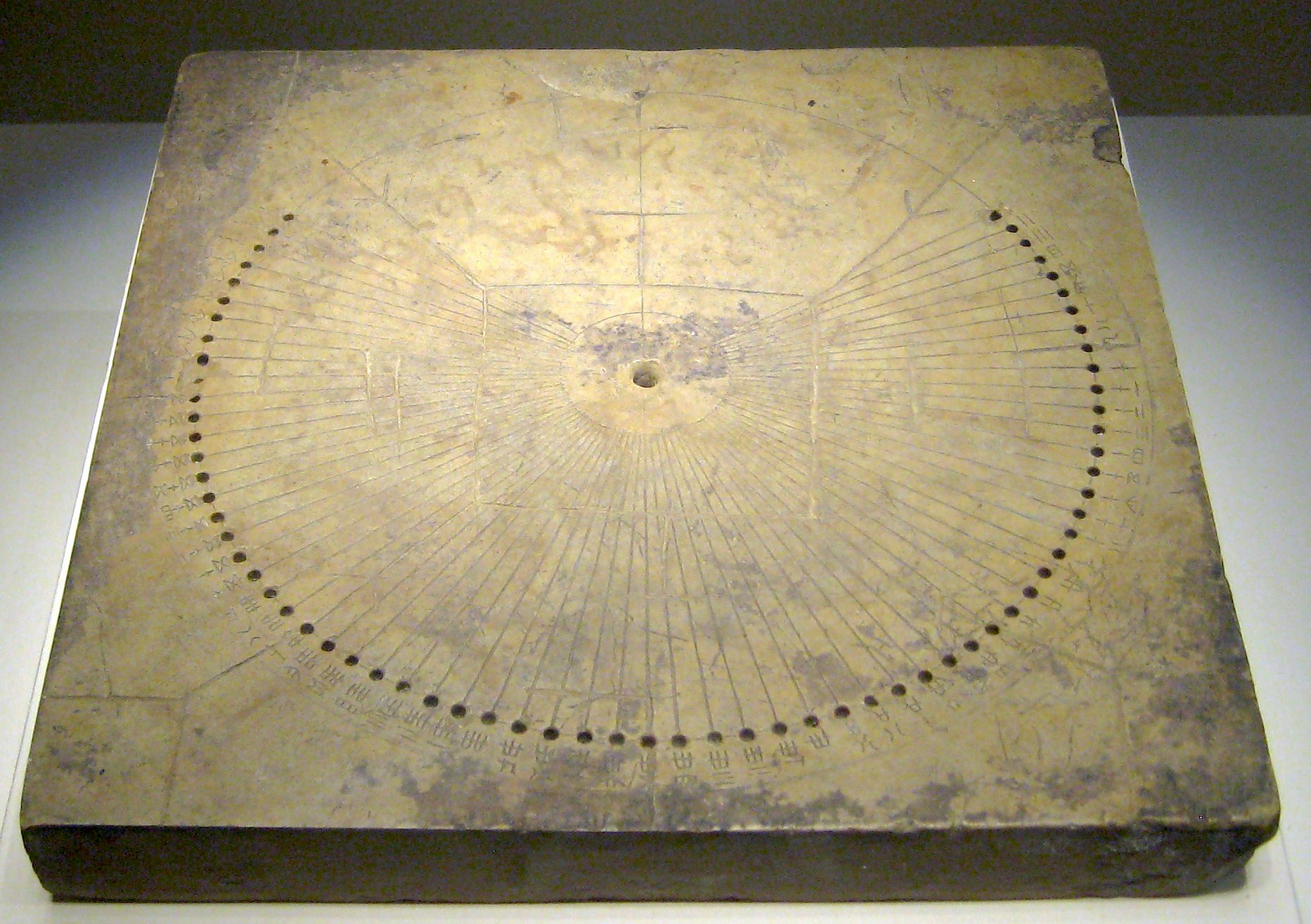
A Han stone sundial overcarved with a Liubo board pattern

In 1897 a Han dynasty stone sundial was discovered in Inner Mongolia which had been overcarved with a Liubo board pattern. The only other complete Han dynasty sundial, in the collection of the Royal Ontario Museum, also has a Liubo pattern carved on it. It may be that the sundials were repurposed as Liubo boards by carving the Liubo pattern over the original sundial markings, or it may be that the Liubo markings were added for some unknown ritual purpose.

=== Divination boards ===
In 1993, a wooden board with turtle divination diagrams and prognostications on one side and a Liubo diagram and forty-five prognostications on five topics on the other side was excavated from a late Western Han tomb at Yinwan in Donghai County, Jiangsu. The Liubo diagram is too small to have been used for playing Liubo, and is covered with the sixty terms of the sexagenary cycle which are written all along the lines of the Liubo diagram, in a similar way that the turtle diagram on the other side of the board is filled with the sixty terms. The prognostications under the Liubo diagram are headed with one of nine terms that correspond to the words of an enigmatic, mnemonic rhyme about Liubo written by Xu Bochang (許博昌) during the reign of Emperor Wu of Han (141–87 BCE); Lillian Tseng (Zeng Lanying) argues that these are the names for particular points on the board (the two lines of the "V" mark, the two lines of the "L" mark, the two lines of the "T" mark, the circle or line between the corner and the central square, the outside edge of the central square, and the inside of the central square).

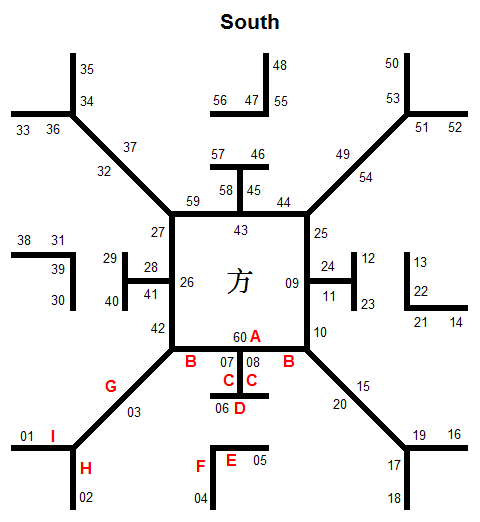
Schematic diagram of the Yinwan Han dynasty Liubo divination diagram, showing the positions of the sixty terms of the sexagenary cycle (following the corrections of Zeng Lanying) and examples of the nine board positions: A=fāng 方 "square"; B=lián 廉 (pàn 畔) "edge"; C=jié 楬 (jiē 揭) "lift"; D=dào 道 "path"; E=zhāng 張 "stretch"; F=qū 曲 (jiǔ 究) "bend"; G=qū 詘 (qū 屈) "curve"; H=cháng 長 (xuán 玄) "long"; I=gāo 高 "tall" (terms used in Xu Bochang's rhyme given in brackets if different).

Li Xueqin has suggested that the board was used for divination by matching the day to be divined to the corresponding sexagenary term on the Liubo diagram, and then reading off the corresponding prognostication according to the position of the sexagenary term on the Liubo diagram. However, Lillian Tseng points out that the divination could also be done the other way round, by looking for the desired prognostication (for example an auspicious marriage day), and then all the days on the Liubo board that were written on the position corresponding to the term heading the prognostication would match the desired prognostication.

It has been theorized that the placement of the sixty sexagenary terms on the points of the Liubo divination diagram indicate the possible positions for placing pieces when playing Liubo, and that the sequence of the terms across the divination diagram reflects the path to be followed around the board when playing the game (starting at the north-east corner and ending at the north side of the central square).

== Players ==
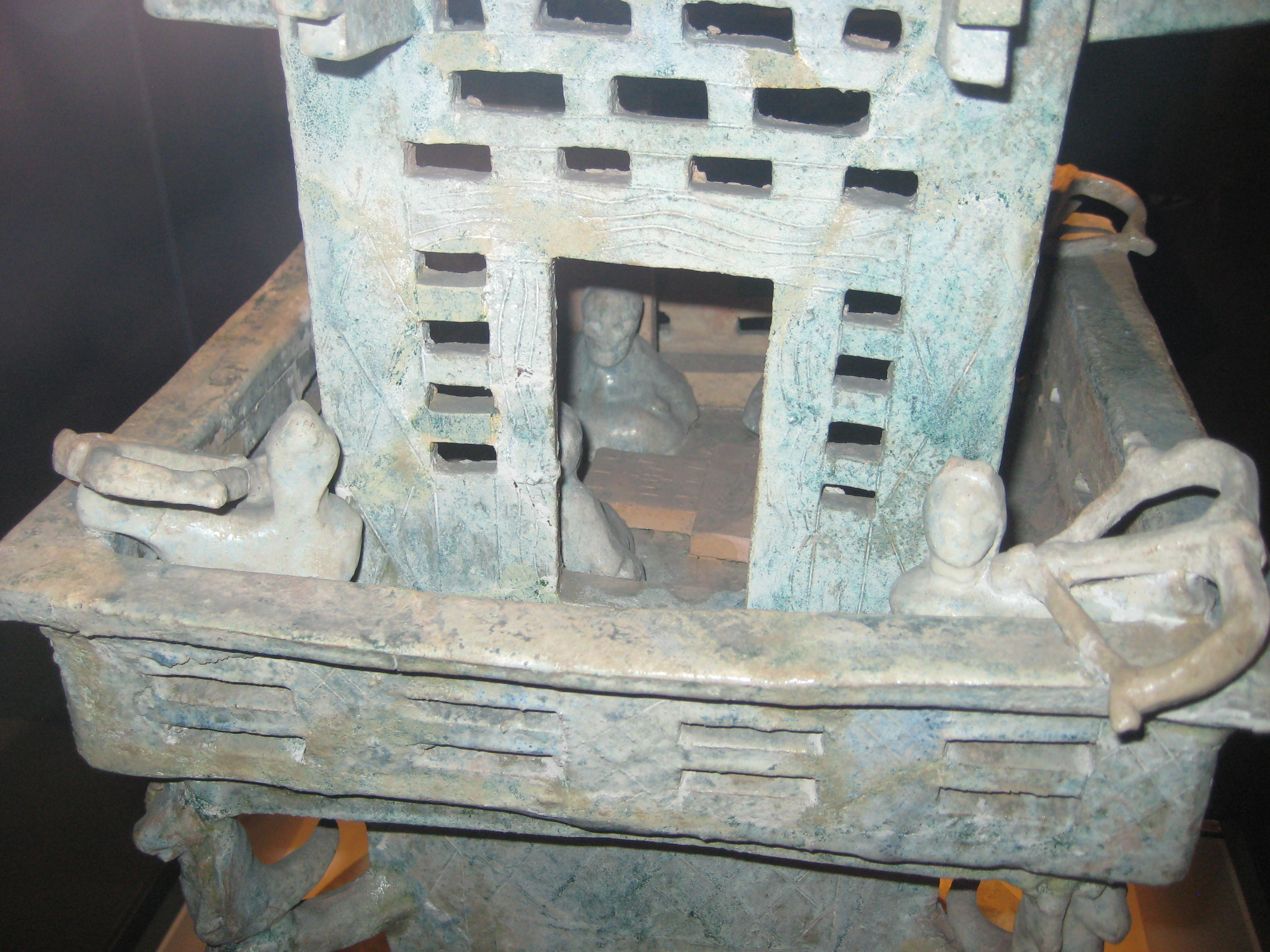
Liubo players inside an Eastern Han model pottery tower

People who have played Liubo include:

- King Mu of Zhou (reigned 977–922 BCE), who according to the apocryphal Travels of King Mu once played a game of Liubo with a hermit that lasted three days.
- Duke Min of Song (宋湣公), who in 682 BCE got into an argument with Nangong Wan 南宮萬 whilst playing Liubo with him, and was killed by Nangong Wan when he hit the duke with the Liubo board.
- King Anxi of Wei 魏安釐王 (reigned 277–243 BCE) and his half-brother Lord Xinling of Wei 信陵君 (died 243 BCE). Once when the two of them were playing Liubo a message came that the beacons on the northern border had been lit; King Anxi wanted to stop the game and discuss the situation with his ministers, but his brother told him not to worry as it was only the king of Zhao on a hunting trip, and so they continued playing. The king was worried and could not concentrate on the game, but after the game was over news came that it was indeed the king of Zhao out hunting.
- Jing Ke (died 227 BCE), the failed assassin of Qin Shi Huang, once had an argument with Lu Goujian (魯句踐) over a game of Liubo, and had to flee for his life.
- Emperor Jing of Han (reigned 156–141 BCE), who when he was crown prince became angry during a game of Liubo with the Prince of Wu, and threw the Liubo board at the prince, killing him (cf. Rebellion of the Seven States).
- Liang Ji (died 159), who according to his biography was fond of playing Liubo.
- Li Guangyan (761–826), a Uyghur general who was presented with a girl who was trained in the arts of "song, dance, music and Liubo".
- Liu Min (895–954), a Shatuo Turk and founder of the Northern Han kingdom, liked to play Liubo and gambling games when he was young.

Confucius did not approve of Liubo. In the Analects he grudgingly allows that playing Liubo and Go is better than being idle, and according to the Kongzi Jiayu (Family Sayings of Confucius) he stated that he would not play the game as it promoted bad habits.

== See also ==
- TLV mirror – Type of bronze mirror that was popular during the Han dynasty in China
- Mandala
