= Shinju-kyo =

Ancient type of Japanese bronze mirror

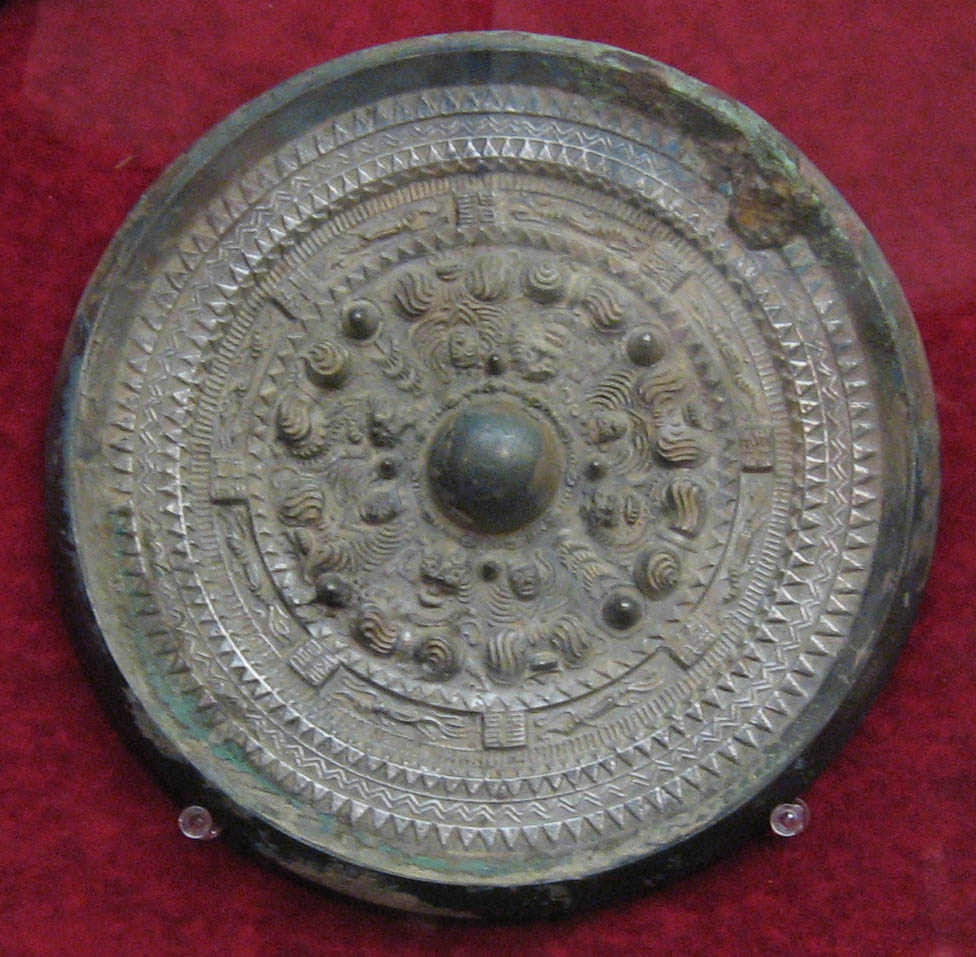
Sankakuen-shinjūkyō from the Tsubai Ōtsukayama kofun in Yamashiro, Kyoto

A Shinjū-kyō (神獣鏡; "deity and beast mirror") is an ancient type of Japanese round bronze mirror decorated with images of gods and animals from Chinese mythology. The obverse side has a polished mirror and the reverse has relief representations of legendary Chinese shén (神 "spirit; god"), xiān (仙 "transcendent; immortal"), and legendary creatures.

== History ==
The shinjū-kyō style of bronze mirror originated from the Chinese magic mirrors and was frequently produced during the Han dynasty, Three Kingdoms, and Six Dynasties (1st–6th centuries CE). With the spread of Chinese bronze casting technology, shinjūkyō were also produced in Japan and the Lelang Commandery and Daifang Commandery in the Korean peninsula. The c. 297 Wei zhi (魏志 "Records of Wei"), which is part of the Records of the Three Kingdoms (三國志), has the first historical reference to bronze mirrors in Japan. It chronicles tributary relations between Queen Himiko of Wa and the Wei court, and records that in 239, Emperor Cao Rui sent presents to Himiko, including "one hundred bronze mirrors".

== Variations ==
Archeological excavations of Japanese tombs from the Kofun period (3rd–7th centuries) have revealed numerous shinjūkyō, and Japanese archeologists divide them into subtypes including:

- sankakuen-shinjūkyō (三角縁神獣鏡; "triangular-rimmed deity and beast mirror")
- gamontai-shinjūkyō (画文帯神獣鏡; "wide image-band deity and beast mirror")
- hirabuchi-shinjūkyō (平縁神獣鏡; "flat-rimmed deity and beast mirror")

Kurotsuka kofun tomb excavated in Nara Prefecture contained 33 sankakuen-shinjūkyō bronze mirrors. Some scholars believe they are the original mirrors that Emperor Cao Rui presented to Queen Himiko, but others disagree.

== See also ==
- Chinese magic mirror
- TLV mirror
- Yata no Kagami

== Bibliography ==
- Edwards, Walter (1998). "Mirrors to Japanese History". Archaeology. 51 (3).
- Edwards, Walter (1999). "Mirrors on Ancient Yamato: The Kurozuka Kofun Discovery and the Question of Yamatai". Monumenta Nipponica. 54 (1): 75–110. doi:10.2307/2668274. JSTOR 2668274.
- Nishikawa, Toshikatsu (1999). "Sankakubuchi shinjukyo (Triangular-rimmed mirrors) and the Mirrors Presented to Himiko". Nihon Kōgaku. 8: 87–99. Archived from the original on 2011-01-31.
- Goodrich, Carrington C., ed. (1951). Japan in the Chinese Dynastic Histories: Later Han Through Ming Dynasties. Translated by Tsunoda, Ryūsaku. South Pasadena, California: P. D. and Ione Perkins.
