= Chinese magic mirror =

Metallic mirrors of ancient China

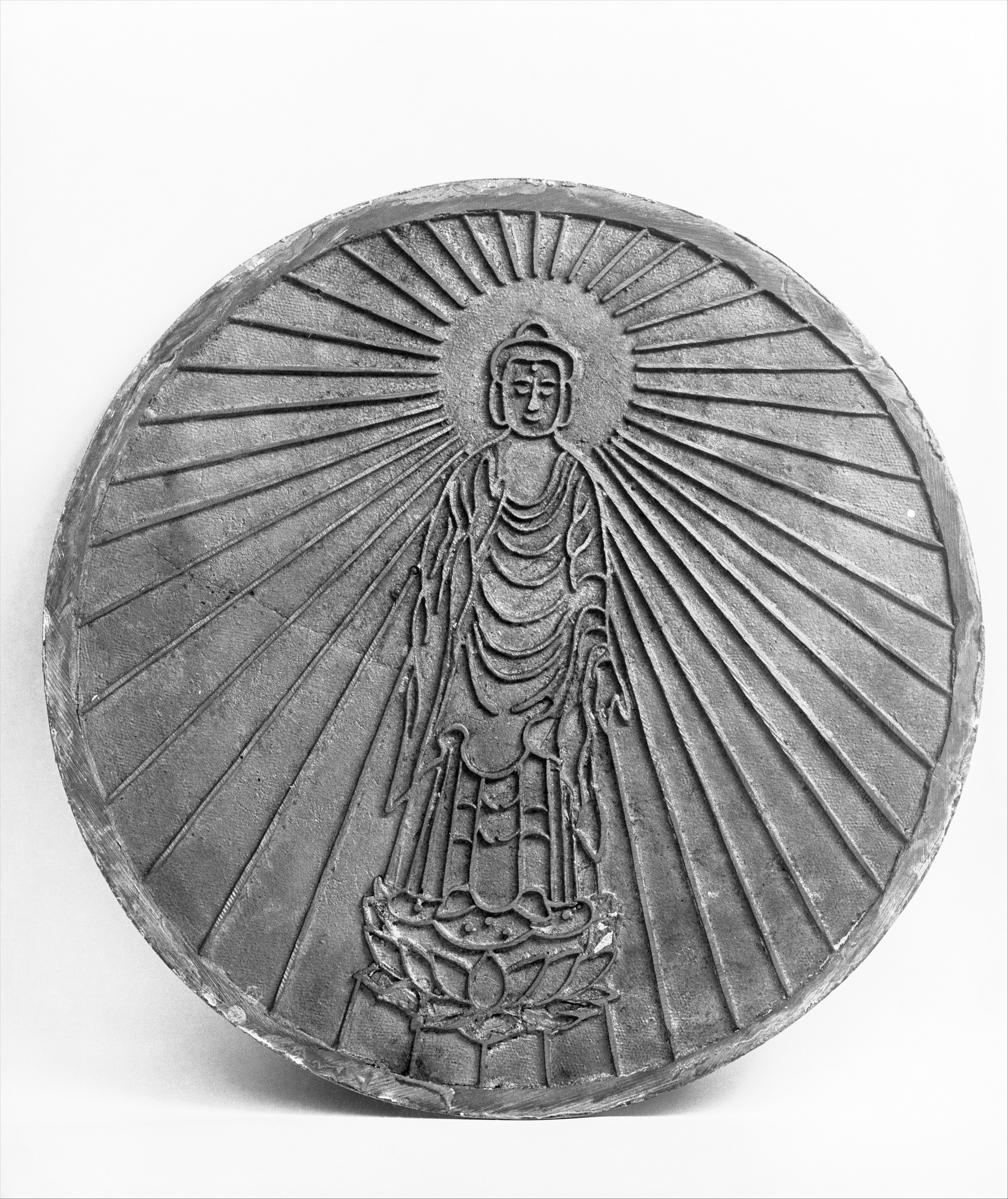
Magic mirror with an image of the Amitābha Buddha, Japan, 19th century. In this example there is a further bronze backplate, with an inscription, so that the Buddha can only be seen as a reflection.

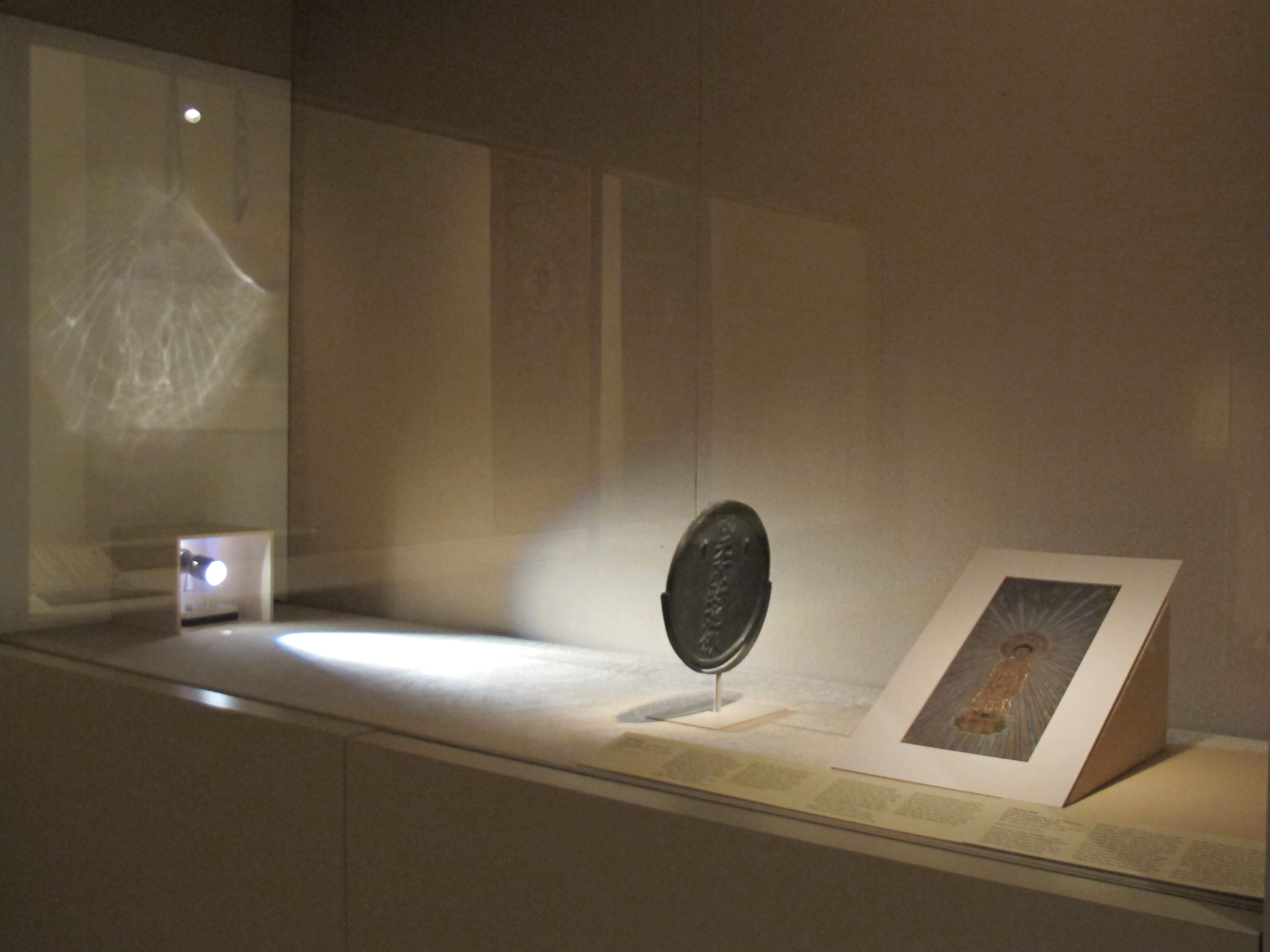
The same mirror reflecting the image onto a screen

The Chinese magic mirror (traditional Chinese: 透光鏡; simplified Chinese: 透光镜; pinyin: tòu guāng jìng) traces back to at least the 5th century, although their existence during the Han dynasty (206 BC – 24 AD) has been claimed. The mirrors were made out of solid bronze. The front was polished and could be used as a mirror, while the back has a design cast in the bronze, or other decoration. When sunlight or other bright light shines onto the mirror, the mirror appears to become transparent. If that light is reflected from the mirror onto a wall, the pattern on the back of the mirror is then projected onto the wall.

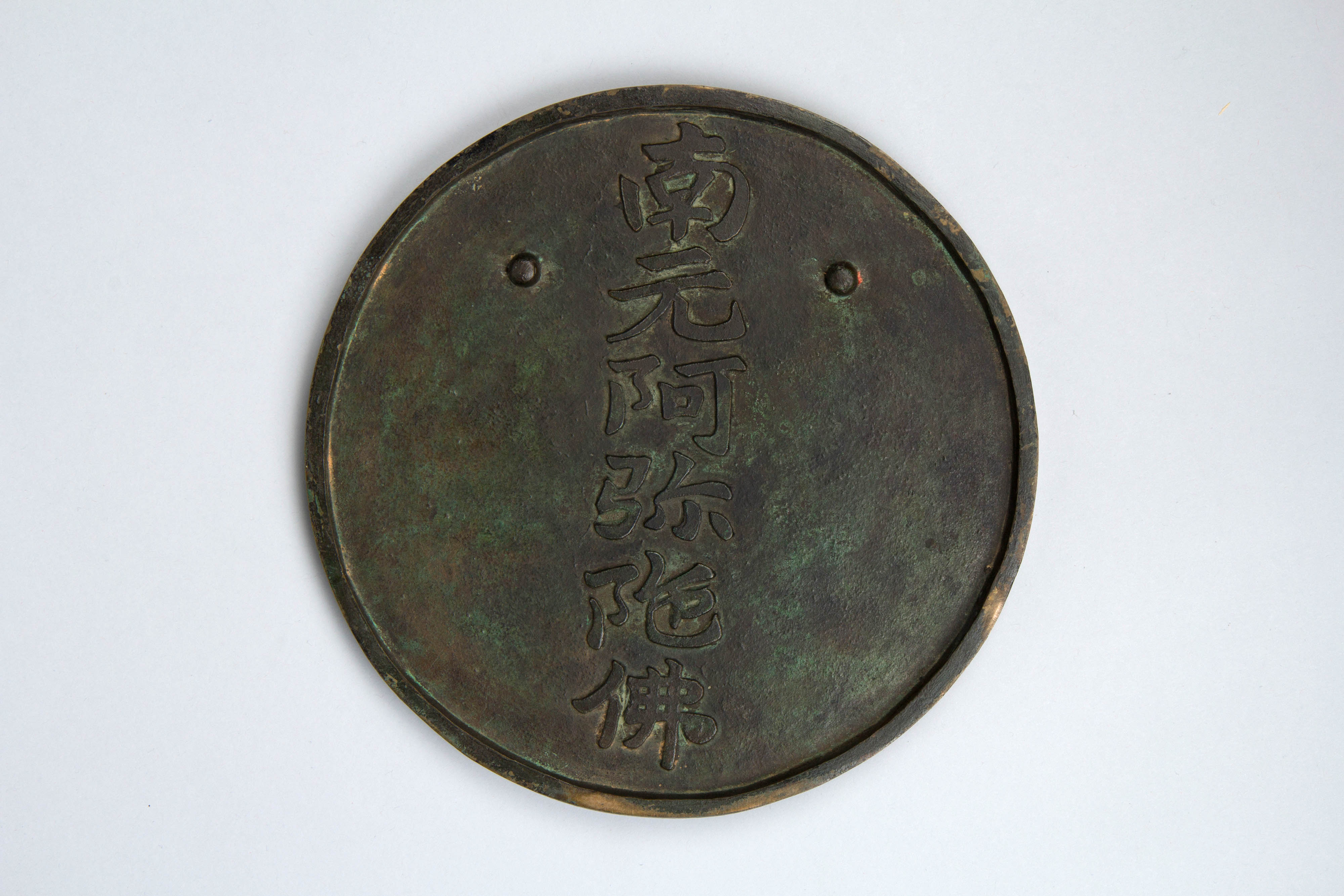
The back of the same mirror

Bronze mirrors were the standard in many Eurasian cultures, but most lacked this characteristic, as did most Chinese bronze mirrors.

== Construction ==
Robert Temple describes their construction:

The basic mirror shape, with the design on the back, was cast flat, and the convexity of the surface produced afterwards by elaborate scraping and scratching. The surface was then polished to become shiny. The stresses set up by these processes caused the thinner parts of the surface to bulge outwards and become more convex than the thicker portions. Finally, a mercury amalgam was laid over the surface; this created further stresses and preferential buckling. The result was that imperfections of the mirror surface matched the patterns on the back, although they were too minute to be seen by the eye. But when the mirror reflected bright sunlight against a wall, with the resultant magnification of the whole image, the effect was to reproduce the patterns as if they were passing through the solid bronze by way of light beams.

== History ==
=== China ===
In about 800 AD, during the Tang dynasty (618–907), a book entitled Record of Ancient Mirrors described the method of crafting solid bronze mirrors with decorations, written characters, or patterns on the reverse side that could cast these in a reflection on a nearby surface as light struck the front, polished side of the mirror; due to this seemingly transparent effect, they were called "light-penetration mirrors" by the Chinese.

This Tang-era book was lost over the centuries, but magic mirrors were described in the Dream Pool Essays by Shen Kuo (1031–1095), who owned three of them as family heirlooms. Perplexed as to how solid metal could be transparent, Shen guessed that some sort of quenching technique was used to produce tiny wrinkles on the face of the mirror too small to be observed by the eye. Although his explanation of different cooling rates was incorrect, he was right to suggest the surface contained minute variations which the naked eye could not detect; these mirrors also had no transparent quality at all, as discovered by the British scientist William Bragg in 1932. Bragg noted that "Only the magnifying effect of reflection makes them [the designs] plain".

=== Japan ===
As the manufacture of mirrors in China increased, it expanded to Korea and Japan. In fact, Emperor Cao Rui and the Wei Kingdom of China gave numerous bronze mirrors (known as Shinju-kyo in Japan) to Queen Himiko of Wa (Japan), where they were received as rare and mysterious objects. They were described as "sources of honesty" as they were said to reflect all good and evil without error. That is why Japan considers a sacred mirror called Yata-no-Kagami to be one of the three great imperial treasures.

Today, Yamamoto Akihisa is said to be the last manufacturer of magic mirrors in Japan. The Kyoto Journal interviewed the craftsman and he explained a small portion of the technique, that he learned from his father.

=== Western Europe ===
The first magic mirror to appear in Western Europe was owned by the director of the Paris Observatory, who, on his return from China, brought several mirrors and one of them was magical. The latter was presented as an unknown object to the French Academy of Sciences in 1844. In total, just four magic mirrors brought from China to Europe, but in 1878 two engineering professors presented to the Royal Society of London several models they had brought from Japan. The English called the artefacts "open mirrors" and for the first time made technical observations regarding their construction.

In 2022, the Cincinnati Art Museum discovered that they had a Chinese magic mirror in their collection. The curator, Hou-mei Sung, discovered that a mirror in their collection reflected an image of Amitabha, an important figure in Chinese Buddhism, his name being inscribed on the back of the mirror.

== See also ==
- TLV mirror
