= Fu (surname) =

Fu is a common transliteration of surnames originating mainly of east Asian languages. For instance, 傅, 符, 付, 扶, 伏, 富, 苻, and 福. The name Fu is found commonly in China, Taiwan, Macau, United States, Malaysia, Hawaii, and Japan.

Notable people with the surname include:

- Fu Yue (傅說) (1324–1265 BC) – A Shang dynasty premier during the reign of Emperor Wu Ding.
- Fu Kuan (傅寬) (died 189 BC) – Marquis of Yangling (posthumously Marquis Jing), a follower of Liu Bang.
- Fu Jing (傅精) (died 165 BC) – 2nd Marquis Jing.
- Fu Ze (傅則) (died 153 BC) – 3rd Marquis Jing.
- Fu Yan (傅偃) (died 122 BC) – 4th and final Marquis Jing. In 122 BC he was tried for plotting a rebellion with the King of Huainan, Liu An. His state was abolished when he died.
- Fu Jiezi (傅介子) – A Han dynasty officer who assassinated the king of the Xiongnu in 77 BC.
- Consort Fu (傅昭儀) (died 3 BC) – A Han dynasty imperial consort and favorite of Emperor Yuan
- Fu Xi (傅喜) – A Han dynasty Marshall of State from 6 – 1 BC.
- Empress Fu (Ai) (傅皇后) (died 1 BC) – A Han dynasty Empress.
- Fu Jun (傅俊) (1st century AD) – One of the Yuntai 28 generals who served Emperor Guangwu.
- Fu Yu (died 87 AD) – Colonel-Protector in Han dynasty China. Killed in a Ch'iang rebellion in 87 AD.
- Fu Xie (died 187 AD) – Han dynasty imperial court adviser.
- Fu Xun (傅巽) – A politician of the state of Cao Wei during the Three Kingdoms period.
- Fu Shou Empress of Han dynasty
- Fu Sheng (3rd century BC)
- Fu Jia – An official of Cao Wei (a.k.a. Fu Gu) (209–255)
- Fu Qian (傅僉) (216–263) – A General of Shu Han during the Three Kingdoms period.
- Fu Xuan (傅玄) (217–278) – A politician, scholar, writer, and poet during the period from the Cao Wei to Western Jin dynasty.
- Fu Hu (傅虎) (died 312) – A Han Zhao dynasty general who sacrificed his life to save Emperor Liu Yao.
- Fu Chang (died 330) – A writer of the Later Zhao dynasty.
- Fu Pi (died 386)
- Fu Liang (傅亮) (374–426) – A high-level official of the Liu Song dynasty, who, along with his colleagues Xu Xianzhi and Xie Hui, deposed Emperor Song.
- Fu Qi (6th century) (傅岐) – An adviser to Emperor Wu of Liang.
- Fu Yi (傅奕) (554–639) – A Sui dynasty official and historiographer during the reign of Emperor Gaozu of the Tang dynasty.
- Fu Youyi (傅遊藝) (died 691) – An official of Wu Zetian's Zhou dynasty.
- Fu Wenjing (傅文靜) – A Tang dynasty magistrate instrumental in the early rise of Niu Xianke.
- Fu Bi (富弼) (1004–1083) – A Song dynasty politician.
- Fu Yaoyu (1024–1091)
- Fu Youde (傅友德) (died 1394) – A General and Navy Commander of the Ming dynasty who subdued the Mongols with an army of 300,000 soldiers.
- Fu An (died 1429)
- Fu Shan (1607–1684) – A Ming and Qing dynasty artist
- Fu Honglie (傅弘烈) (died 1680)
- Fu Nai (1758–1811)
- Fu Zuoyi (1895–1974)
- Fu Daqing (1900 – c. 1944)
- Fu Lei (1908–1966) – Chinese translator and art critic
- Alexander Fu Sheng (傅聲) (1954–1983) – Hong Kong Martial Arts Film Star
- Fu Yiwei – Chinese female curler
- Grace Fu (傅海燕) - A Singaporean politician
- Xiaolan Fu – Chinese economist
- Warren Fu – American music video director
- Fu Kun-chi（傅崑萁）(born 1962/5/8) - A Taiwanese politician, the legislator of Hualian County.
- Marco Fu (born 1978) – Professional snooker player from Hong Kong
- Leslie Fu (born 1992) – American Twitch streamer
- Fu Haitao (born 1993) – Chinese triple jumper
- Fu Jing (born 1995) – Chinese singer, actress, former member of Rocket Girls 101
- Fu Yuanhui (傅园慧) (born 1996) – Chinese swimmer

== Fictional characters ==
- Fu Manchu
