= Consort Fu =

Consort Fu may refer to:

- Consort Fu (Yuan) (傅昭儀, died 2 BC), concubine of Emperor Yuan of Han
- Empress Fu (Ai) (傅皇后, died 1 BC), wife of Emperor Ai of Han
- Fu Shou (伏壽, died 214), wife of Emperor Xian of Han
- Queen Fu (苻王后, fl. 394), wife of Qifu Gangui (ruler of Western Qin)
- Fu sisters (Fu Mo's daughters)
  - Fu Song'e (苻娀娥, died 404), concubine of Murong Xi (Emperor Zhaowen of Later Yan)
  - Fu Xunying (苻訓英, died 407), wife of Murong Xi
- Fu sisters (Fu Yanqing's daughters)
  - Empress Fu the Elder (符皇后, 931–956), second wife of Chai Rong (Emperor Shizong of Later Zhou)
  - Empress Dowager Fu (Later Zhou) (符太后, died 993), third wife of Chai Rong
  - Princess Fu (Song dynasty) (苻氏, 941–975), Emperor Taizong of Song's first wife, died before he took the throne

== See also ==
- Empress Fu (disambiguation)
