= Empress Fu =

Empress Fu may refer to:

== Empresses with surname Fú 苻 ==
- Queen Fu (苻王后, fl. 394), wife of Qifu Gangui, ruler of Western Qin
- Fu Xunying (苻訓英, died 407), empress of Murong Xi (Emperor Zhaowen of Later Yan)
- Elder Empress Fu (符皇后, 931–956), first empress of Chai Rong (Guo Rong, Emperor Shizong of Later Zhou)
- Empress Dowager Fu (Later Zhou) (符太后, died 993), second empress of Emperor Shizong of Later Zhou, Elder Empress Fu's younger sister

Posthumous empresses

- Fu Song'e (苻娀娥, died 404), Fu Xunying's elder sister and Murong Xi's consort
- Princess Fu (Song dynasty) (苻氏, 941–975), sister of Elder Empress Fu and Empress Dowager Fu (Later Zhou), Emperor Taizong of Song's first wife

== Others ==
- Empress Fu (Ai) (傅皇后, died 1 BC), empress of Emperor Ai of Han (Liu Xin)
- Fu Shou (伏壽, died 214), empress of Emperor Xian of Han (Liu Xie)

== See also ==
- Empress Dowager Fu (disambiguation)
- Consort Fu (disambiguation)
- Fu (surname)
