= Empress Dowager Fu =

Empress Dowager Fu may refer to:

- Empress Fu (Ai) (傅昭儀, given name unknown) (died 1 BC), Chinese consort and empress dowager of the Han dynasty
- Empress Dowager Fu (Later Zhou) (小符皇后, given name unknown) (died 993), second empress of Chai Rong of the Later Zhou dynasty

== See also ==
- Empress Fu (disambiguation)
