= Empress Fu the Younger =

Empress Fu the Younger may refer to:

- Fu Xunying (died 407), empress of the Later Yan dynasty, also known as Empress Fu the Younger (小苻皇后)
- Empress Dowager Fu (Later Zhou) (932–993), empress of the Later Zhou dynasty, also known as Empress Fu the Younger (小符皇后)

== See also ==
- Empress Fu (disambiguation)
