= Yuanshou =

Yuanshou was a Chinese era name used by several emperors of China. It may refer to:

- Yuanshou (元狩, 122BC–117BC), an era name used by Emperor Wu of Han
- Yuanshou (元壽, 2BC–1BC), an era name used by Emperor Ai of Han
