= The Emperor and the Endless Palace =

2024 novel by Justinian Huang

- Author: Justinian Huang
- Genre: Romance, Fantasy, Thriller
- Publisher: Mira Books
- Publication date: March 2024
- Pages: 320
- ISBN: 978-0-7783-0523-1

The Emperor and the Endless Palace is Justinian Huang's debut novel, published in 2024. It was a finalist for the 2025 Ignyte Award for Outstanding Novel – Adult and chosen as a 2025 Stonewall Honor Book.

== Plot ==
The novel switches between three tales across different settings. All center on the romance between two men.

The first tale is a romance between a palace clerk and emperor in Han dynasty China. The tale occurs in 4 BCE, when the courtier Dong Xian is instructed to become Emperor Ai's lover by the Dowager Empress. Dong Xian rises at court by having sex with men at the guidance of the dowager empress, eventually meeting the emperor.

Next is the tale of an innkeeper, He Shican, who is drawn to a mysterious stranger in Qing dynasty China in 1740. Jiulang, who appears to be a young man, asks He Shican for help with a curse set upon his grandmother. The task is dangerous and Jiulang is actually a nine-tailed fox spirit, but He Shican follows along because he is infatuated.

In the final tale, River is a semi-closeted student in Los Angeles. He meets Joey, an artist and sex worker, at a party where River is on a date with a different man. River feels intensely attracted to Joey, who has created dozens of works of art about River without having met him before.

== Creation ==
Justinian Huang decided to write the book when he heard about the queer backstory to the fall of the Han dynasty. He related to the youth of the Emperor Ai and his lover, Dong Xian, and Huang thought this was a romance that needed to be retold. He began writing parts of the tale when he lived in Shanghai from 2015 to 2020. When the COVID-19 pandemic began, he moved to California and wrote the rest of the book in two months during lockdown. He initially wrote the three tales as similar but separate stories of parallel romances, but realized it would be more powerful to connect their lives in the novel.

== Publication ==
Huang found a publisher with the help of Evan Yeong and Eden Railsback at HarperCollins, and Clare Mao at Greenburger. He recalled feeling "rattled" by the lack of interest that many established editors of Asian descent showed in his work. The novel was accepted at HarperCollins, where Yeong became its editor, and it was published by Nicole Brebner with MIRA Books.

In 2024, Harlequin Audio released an audiobook edition, with the first tale narrated by Dylan J. Locke, the second by Will Dao, and the third by Telly Leung.

== Reception ==
The Emperor and the Endless Palace was a finalist for the 2025 Ignyte Award in the category of Outstanding Novel: Adult. It was also chosen as a Stonewall Honor Book in the Literature category for 2025.

Publishers Weekly gave the novel a starred review, citing its epic romance and compelling narrative. They noted its rich roots in Chinese history and mythology. Elias Eells, for The Ancillary Review of Books, said the novel explored themes of "queer masculinity, eroticism, the intersections of sex and nightlife, and the complications of desire both tender and violent". Eells praised the debut work, noting especially the cinematic quality of the settings and action, as well as the clever uses of different points of view. The review also noted the explicit eroticism of the work and its importance at a time when queer men and Asian men face stigmatization. Eells compared the work to those of Lee Mandelo, Brent C. Lambert, and Bendi Barrett.

Kirkus Reviews characterized the audiobook narration, calling Locke's portrayal of Dong Xian as seemingly canny and carefree, until he is outplayed. The review described Dao's portrayal of He Shican as melancholy, then infatuated, and said that Leung cast River as initially nervous and eager, but "ultimately unwilling to lose himself".
