= Dong Xian =

Han dynasty politician

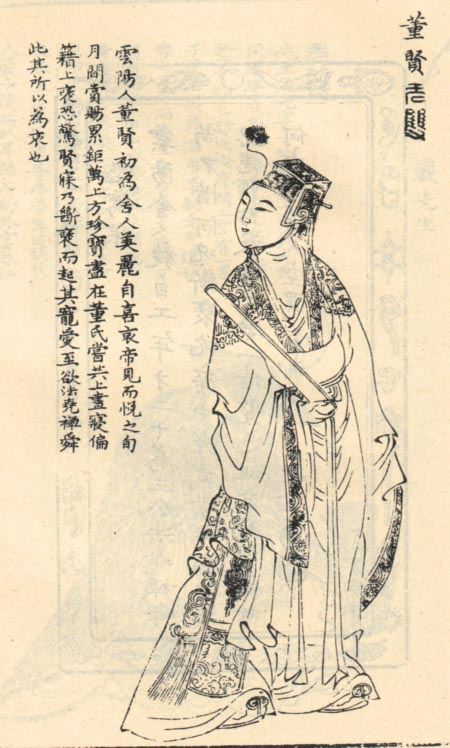
- Dong Xian as depicted in the Wu Shuang Pu (無雙譜, Table of Peerless Heroes) by Jin Guliang
- Born: 22 BC
- Died: 16 August 1 BC (aged 21)
- Occupation: Commander of the armed forces
- Spouse: Married
- Partner: Emperor Ai of Han

Dong Xian (董賢; 22 BC – 16 August 1 BC) was a Chinese Han dynasty politician who quickly rose from obscurity as a minor official to become the most powerful official in the imperial administration of Emperor Ai within a span of a few years, and he had both the interest and the complete trust of the emperor.

Most scholars agree that Dong's quick career advancement came mostly because of his personal relationship with Emperor Ai, very likely a romantic and sexual one, rather than a demonstration of abilities. Both men were married to women, but Emperor Ai, at least, was childless.

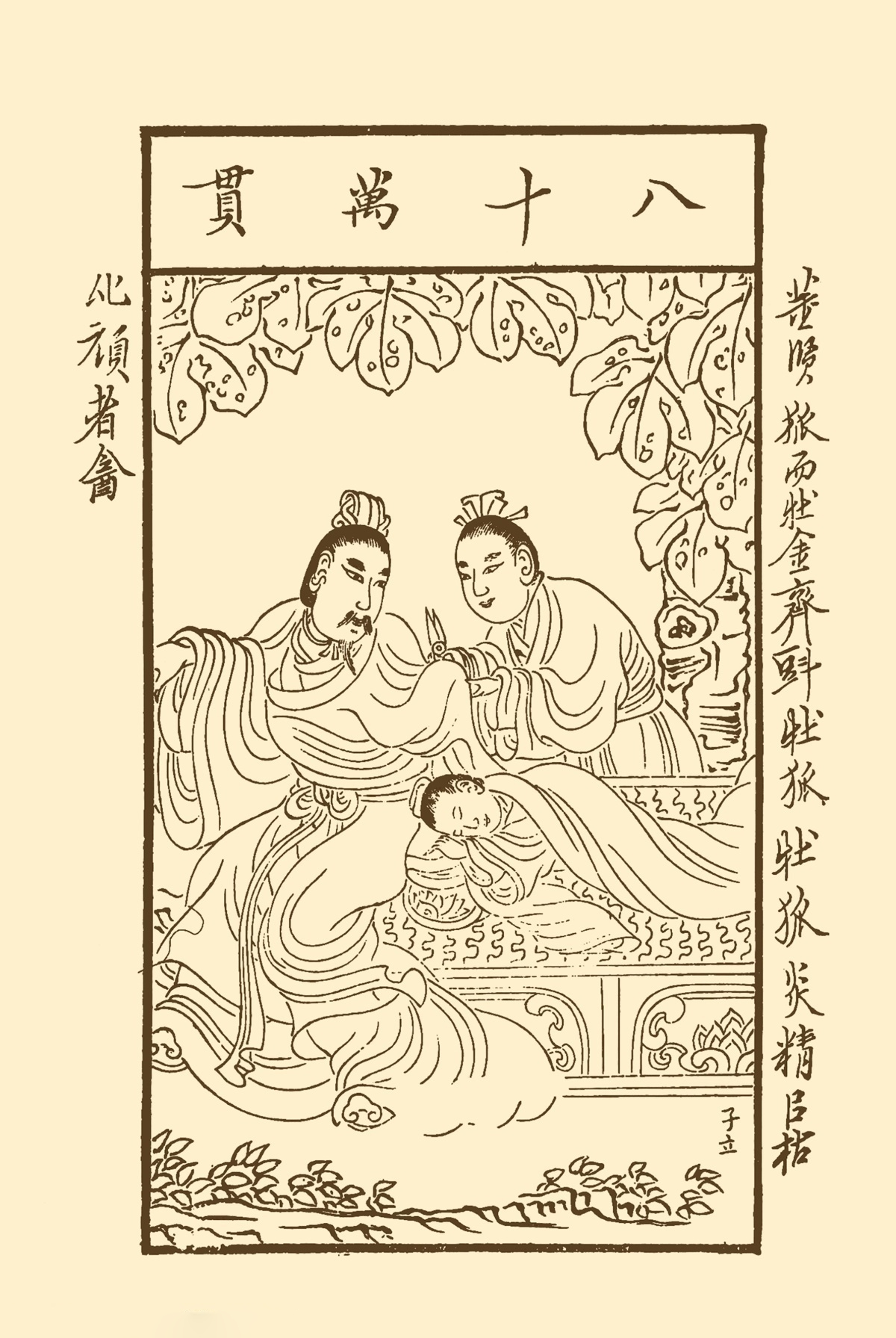
Emperor Ai of Han cuts off his sleeve to not awaken Dong Xian

An idiomatic term for homosexuality in Chinese is duanxiu zhi pi (斷袖之癖, literally, "passion of the cut sleeve"), derived from an episode involving Dong and Emperor Ai. They often slept together on the same straw mat. One afternoon, after Emperor Ai woke up from a nap, Dong was still sleeping, and Emperor Ai's sleeve was stuck under Dong's head. Rather than waking Dong up, Emperor Ai cut off his sleeve to allow Dong to continue to sleep without disturbance.

== Early career ==
It is unclear when Dong became a court official, but it is known that early in Emperor Ai's reign (which lasted from 7 BC to 1 BC), Dong was a minor imperial secretary (郎, lang), and he was a colleague of the later-posthumously famous Confucian scholar Yang Xiong.

By 4 BC, at the age of 18, he was an imperial attendant (侍中, shizhong) and the director of imperial equine operations (駙馬都尉), fuma duwei. In later dynasties, this became a title for princesses' husbands. That was not true during the Han dynasty, and it is, in any case, clear that Dong did not marry a princess. His relationship with Emperor Ai would allow him to suddenly increase his power and prestige.

== Relationship with Emperor Ai and Ascension ==
By around 4 BC, Dong had become a favorite of Emperor Ai's. It was described that whenever Emperor Ai visited places outside the palace, Dong would accompany him, and once Emperor Ai returned to the palace, he would attend to the emperor. Emperor Ai rewarded him with large sums of money. Dong's wife was given unprecedented permission to enter and leave the palace as she wished, and she set up a residence with Dong inside the palace. Emperor Ai also made Dong's sister an imperial consort (with the prestigious title zhaoyi (昭儀)), ranked just below his wife Empress Fu. The three members of the Dong family thereby spent day and night near the emperor. Dong's father Dong Gong (董恭) was made the minister of palace supplies and created an acting marquess (關內侯).

Emperor Ai further ordered the imperial architect to build a luxurious residence for Dong just outside the main imperial palace, Weiyang Palace. The residence was described to be so spacious that it was like an imperial palace itself. Emperor Ai also gave Dong the best weapons and the most precious jewels from the imperial treasury– so much so that what Dong used was even more precious than what Emperor Ai personally used. Further, imperial burial tools were pre-awarded to Dong in preparation for his eventual burial, and Dong's future tomb was built right next to Emperor Ai's tomb.

In 3 BC, Emperor Ai became intent on making Dong a marquess, but could find no good excuse to do it. At the suggestion of a member of his grandmother's clan named Fu Jia (傅嘉), a plan was hatched. In 4 BC, informants Xifu Gong (息夫躬) and Sun Chong (孫寵) had, through the eunuch Song Hong (宋弘), reported that Liu Yun (劉雲), the Prince of Dongping, was using witchcraft; as a result, Prince Yun was demoted to commoner status and committed suicide. Emperor Ai announced that the plot was reported through Dong, not Song, and then made Dong, Xifu, and Sun acting marquesses. Later that year, over Prime Minister Wang Jia's objection, Emperor Ai made the three of them marquesses.

A good number of officials tried to curb Dong's power by begging Emperor Ai not to overly reward him, and they suffered for it. There is no evidence indicating that Dong was behind the punishment of these officials; rather, it appears that Emperor Ai was personally offended that these officials attacked his lover and therefore punished them for it. The officials included:

- Zheng Chong (鄭崇), the palace secretary general, who was arrested and who died while in prison in 3 BC;
- Sun Bao (孫寶), the governor of the capital province, who tried to get Zheng released, was himself relieved of his post.
- Wujiang Long (毋將隆), the security chief for the capital of Chang'an, refused to transfer the weapons to Dong and was demoted to the post of security chief for the Commandery of Pei.
- Wang Jia (王嘉), the prime minister, tried several times to prevent Dong from being made a marquess and being promoted; he was imprisoned and committed suicide within the prison in 2 BC; Emperor Ai's own uncle Ding Ming (丁明), the commander of the armed forces, who was friendly with Wang and grieved for his death, was relieved of his post and returned to his march.

However, Wang Hong (王閎), an imperial attendant and grandnephew of Grand Empress Dowager Wang Zhengjun, the step-grandmother of Emperor Ai, who also made similar requests to Emperor Ai, was not punished (because Emperor Ai was impressed by his bravery). Nevertheless, Wang's advice was also not heeded.

On 30 January 1 BC, after Ding's successor Wei Shang (韋尚) died of an illness, Emperor Ai made Dong, at the age of 22 (by East Asian reckoning), the commander of the armed forces (大司馬, da sima) - one of the Three Ducal Ministers, along with the prime minister (大司徒, da situ) and the prime examiner (大司空, da sikong) - and the security chief for the capital. The edict read:

Heaven gave you to be the helper for [the] Han dynasty. I know your faithfulness, and I hope that you can guide the great affairs of the empire and follow what is good.

The edict's wording followed that of the alleged wording of Emperor Yao when he passed his throne to Emperor Shun, and greatly surprised and shocked all who read it.

Despite his ascension to such a great post, Dong continued to accompany Emperor Ai at all times in the palace, not handling the important matters that his post should have required him to handle. At the same time, his father Dong Gong was promoted to an honorary post, while his younger brother Dong Kuanxin (董寬信) was made the director of imperial equine operations, succeeding Dong Xian. Many members of the Dong clan were made imperial attendants or deputy ministers.

== Death ==
In August 1 BC, Emperor Ai suddenly died at the age of 24 without an heir. Dong Xian, as the commander of the armed forces, was the most powerful official at court, but he was paralyzed by this sudden event. Grand Empress Dowager Wang took decisive action; she proceeded to Weiyang Palace and seized the imperial seal. She then summoned Dong, who was caught by surprise and was unable to act. Grand Empress Dowager Wang summoned her nephew Wang Mang back to the palace as well and transferred the command of the imperial guard from Dong to Wang.

Wang Mang then ordered the palace secretary to issue an article of impeachment against Dong, accusing Dong of failing to attend to Emperor Ai when he had been ill. Dong was prohibited from entering the palace, and was relieved of his post the next day. After knowing of his dismissal, Dong and his wife committed suicide, and were buried that night. Wang Mang disinterred him to make sure that he was in fact dead, and then had him reburied within a prison. The entire Dong clan was exiled to Hepu (合浦, in modern Zhanjiang, Guangdong) and had their assets forfeited to the imperial treasury.
