= Dai Qing =

Chinese journalist and activist

- 傅小庆
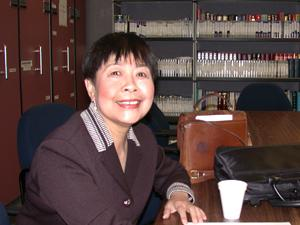
- A photograph of Dai Qing from the Voice of America archives.
- Born: August 24, 1941 (age 85)
- Education: Harbin Institute of Military Engineering
- Occupations: Author, Political Activist, Academic, Intelligence Officer, Engineer.
- Political party: Chinese Communist Party (until 1989)
- Criminal charges: "Advocating bourgeois liberalization and instigating civil unrest"
- Criminal penalty: 10 Months Imprisonment. House arrest.
- Awards: Nieman Fellow (Harvard University); Fellowship - Columbia University School of Journalism; Fellowship - Woodrow Wilson Center; Fellowship - Australian National University; Golden Pen of Freedom Award; Goldman Environmental Prize

Dai Qing
- Chinese: 戴晴
Transcriptions
Standard Mandarin
- Hanyu Pinyin: Dài Qíng

Fu Xiaoqing
- Simplified Chinese: 傅小庆
- Traditional Chinese: 傅小慶
Transcriptions
Standard Mandarin
- Hanyu Pinyin: Fù Xiǎoqìng

Fu Ning
- Chinese: 傅凝
Transcriptions
Standard Mandarin
- Hanyu Pinyin: Fù Níng

Fu Xiaoqing (Chinese: 傅小庆, born 24 August 1941), better known by her pen name Dai Qing (Chinese: 戴晴), is a journalist and activist for China-related issues; most significantly against the Three Gorges Dam Project. She left the Chinese Communist Party after the bloodshed of 1989 Tiananmen Square protests and massacre and was thereafter incarcerated for ten months at maximum security facility Qincheng Prison. Dai is also an author who has published many influential books, articles, and journals.

== Early life and education ==
Fu Xiaoqing was born 24 August 1941 in Chongqing, Sichuan. Her father was Fu Daqing, an activist from Jiangxi who had studied Russian in Moscow and participated in armed rebellions in Nanchang and Guangzhou; her mother, Feng Dazhang (alternatively known as Yang Jie), had good family connections and had trained as a petroleum engineer in Japan. Both were Chinese Communist Party (CCP) activists and had begun doing intelligence work for the CCP following the Japanese invasion of China in 1937. They had two more children after Xiaoqing. In 1944 or 1945, Japanese occupation forces arrested Daqing and executed him. Feng was also arrested, but eventually released.

After the Second World War ended, Xiaoqing and her mother moved to Beijing. Xiaoqing was abandoned by her mother and subsequently adopted by revolutionary leader and politician Ye Jianying, a friend of her father's, and she was raised as part of his family. Xiaoqing started school and began using the name Fu Ning. Her middle school provided students with a strong liberal arts education, and Fu read widely as a child, becoming familiar with classic Russian and Western European literature before discovering American authors as a young adult. Her mother remarried.

From 1960 to 1966, Fu studied automatic missile guidance systems at the Harbin Institute of Military Engineering. While a student she also became a formal member of the CCP.

== Career ==
=== Technician and spy ===
After graduating in 1966, Fu was briefly employed at a research institute of the Number Seven Ministry of Machinery Industry, working on gyroscopes for intercontinental ballistic missile guidance systems. When the Cultural Revolution started that year, Fu joined the Red Guards, but soon began feeling disillusioned with the movement's political leaders. Although she had not yet reached the politically mandated age for marriage and parenthood, Fu married Wang Dejia, a model research worker she had met at the Ministry research institute. The couple soon had one child, a daughter.

From 1968 to 1971, Fu and Wang were sent to attend governmental cadre schools in Zhanjiang and Dongting Lake, where they were forced to work as labourers on a remote farm. Their daughter was taken away and given to another family to raise during this period, and Fu was not permitted to leave the farm to visit her, even though she sent most of her monthly earnings to support the child. They did not see their daughter again until after their release from farm work. In 1972, Fu and her husband returned to Beijing and worked as technicians in a surveillance equipment factory under the Ministry of Public Security. From 1978 to 1979, Fu took English lessons at the PLA Foreign Languages Institute in Nanjing. She had noticed a widespread lack of children's books for Chinese children and was interested in translating English books for her daughter.

Fu published a short story in November 1979 – her first published work – and at this point began using the name Dai Qing. While studying at the Foreign Languages Institute, she had been recruited by the Chinese army's intelligence department. Because of her writing skills and English ability, she was assigned to join the Chinese Writers Association, make foreign contacts, and spy on writers taking part in international exchange programs. Her career as a spy turned out to be short-lived: her cover was blown by a colleague who gave a list of army personnel to the CIA, and Dai subsequently left the army in 1982.

After she left the Army in 1982, she joined Guangming Daily (光明日報) as a news reporter.

=== Early life as a journalist ===
In 1966, Dai Qing graduated from the Harbin Military Engineering Academy (哈爾濱軍事工程學院), predecessor of National University of Defense Technology. After graduation, she furthered her studies in Japan to become an oil engineer, and she was also trained as a missile engineer. In the same year, she worked as an engineer in a top secret plant which specialized in intercontinental missiles. After working as an engineer, she started her career as a writer/news reporter.

She was noticed in 1969 when the Guangming Daily published her short story which depicted the plight of a husband and a wife separated during the Cultural Revolution. As a result, she joined the China Writers Association in 1982. After publishing the short fiction, "Pan" ("盼"), she was paid high tribute as an author.

She then became a reporter for the Guangming Daily and she remained as a columnist from 1982 to 1989. Dai gained attention when she published a series of interviews with China's leading intellectual. She was the first Chinese journalist to announce the views and points of dissidents — people such as astrophysicist Fang Lizhi.

At that time, Dai was a dedicated patriot. She once said that she would die if Mao Zedong needed her to do so—but after three to five years, she gradually changed her stance. Dai wanted to understand her community and the lives of ordinary citizens through the eyes of a journalist. She hoped to be able to contribute to the community. She was described as a supporter a Neoauthoritarianism in 1988 whereby China's hope for freedom and democracy lies with an enlightened autocrat; although she agreed with the idea in principle, she said that "China's tragedy is that we have no such new authoritarian."

Dai has a quixotic style of sudden asides in her writing, which may occasionally confuse the reader. At times, her biting sarcasm may be lost on those not intimately acquainted with China's political and journalistic culture.

Dai investigated and published works on some of the ignored figures in the history of communist China such as Wang Shiwei and Chu Anping.

=== Opposition against the Three Gorges Dam ===
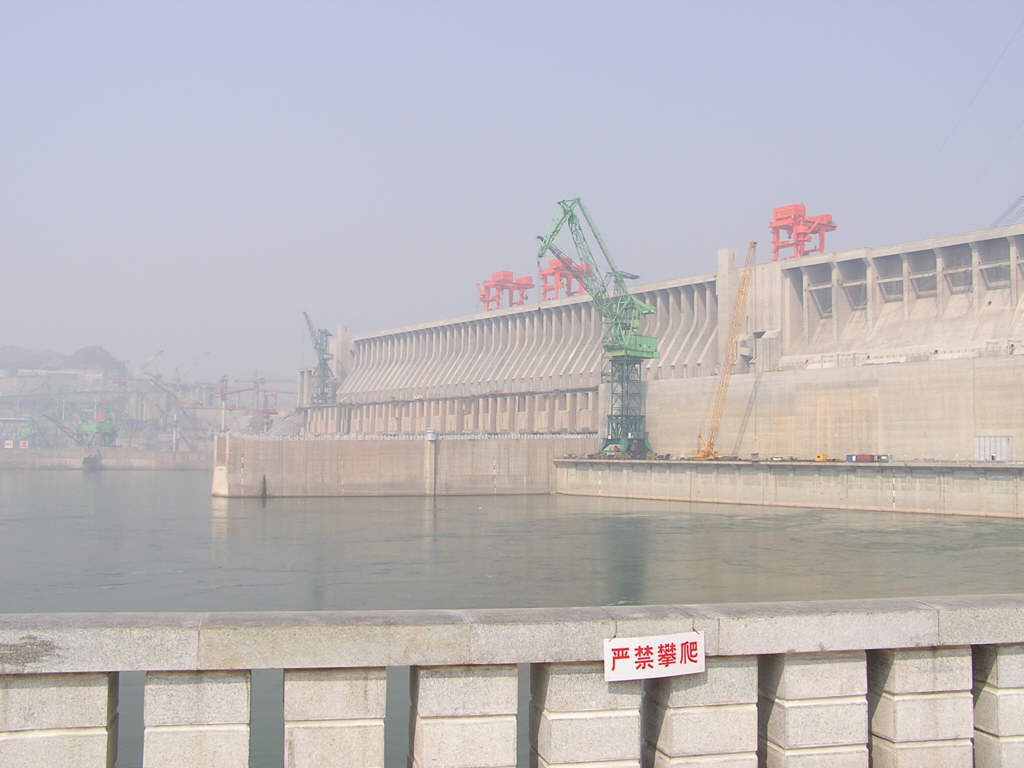
Three Gorges Dam

Dai involvement with the Three Gorges Dam Project on the Yangtze River began in 1985 when she went to a press conference organized by a group (who included Sun Yueqi, a friend of her mother) opposed to the project. A group of old respected Chinese scientists, including Zhou Peiyuan and Lin Hua (林華), visited Three Gorges to inspect the region for dam construction, and a conference was held in the Hall of the Chinese People's Political Forum to present their findings, which The Ministry of Media told the press not to report. Dai found that she was the only journalist who turned up. However, Dai found the scientists' findings to be reasonable, and she became interested in what was then the major environmental issue in China.

In 1987, she made a visit to Hong Kong where she found journalists and intellectuals who were free to express their opinions on the Three Gorges Dam project. The Chinese media, on the other hand, was controlled by the Chinese government, and citizens who might be affected by the project were unaware of the debate on the dam. She felt that it was her responsibility to inform the public on any opposing view on the Three Gorges Dam project. She met a writer named Lin Feng, and he mailed her all the Hong Kong newspaper articles related to this issue. She regarded the project as "the most environmentally and socially destructive project in the world", and hoped her writing would encourage Chinese people to speak out and avoid repeating past mistakes.

In 1989, when it became apparent that the government was going ahead with the project, she collected articles opposing the project which led to the publication of the book Yangtze! Yangtze! (是否该进行长江三峡水坝的工程). The book includes interviews and essays from the Chinese scientists and journalists opposed to the project. She joined a number of prominent individuals opposed to the project, including Zhou Peiyuan, Zhang Jie, Li Pu, and Li Rui, in a conference held in the Hall of Chinese People's Political Forum to protest against the government's decision on the Three Gorges Dam.

She argued that there was already serious emigration, either legal or illegal, from China to other countries, like Canada, the United States, Europe and so on. The project would create a large number of refugees needing a place to live, which would further aggravate the legal or illegal emigration problem. In addition, the project would have had global effect on the climate. Dai claimed that there was a potential risk for both the Yangtze River and the Yellow River to dry up, leading the sandstorms in Inner Mongolia to have a greater influence on Korea, Japan and even the west coast of the United States.

Besides publishing Yangtze! Yangtze!, she also authored many books to share her opinions, especially about the Three Gorges Dam project such as The River Dragon Has Come! (水龍來了!). However, Yangtze! Yangtze! was banned after the 1989 Tiananmen Square protests and massacre.

=== Life in prison ===
In 1989, student protest movement broke out. Dai Qing joined other scholars by calling on the government to curtail corruption and support democratic reform. When students staged the April 27 demonstrations that included a hunger strike in Tiananmen Square, Dai Qing made a passionate speech there, encouraging students to leave peacefully to avoid bloodshed. If they stayed, she warned, they could provoke a violent crackdown that could seriously set back the process of reform. She was not heeded, and the crackdown came on June 4.

On June 4, 1989, after the massacre at Tiananmen Square, she publicly announced her decision to quit the Chinese Communist Party.

After the incident, many scholars either went into hiding, were detained, According to one of her books, My Imprisonment, (我的入獄, Wo de Ruyu) Dai mentioned that the police had visited her the day before her imprisonment as a way of warning her. However, she did not plan to run away for her life because she loved her country. She said, "As a citizen of a country, I cannot leave her. And I have to criticise it in order to build a more perfect and stronger one."

On June 29, 1989, Dai Qing was denounced by the Mayor of Beijing Chen Xitong along with other reformist intellectuals. Dai Qing was arrested in early July 1989 and imprisoned on the charge of "advocating bourgeois liberalization and instigating civil unrest." She spent the next ten months at maximum security facility Qincheng Prison. She was formally denounced by her former co-workers at Guangming Daily, and in September of that year the Press and Publication Bureau banned domestic sales of her writings.

Upon her release in May 1990, Dai Qing was forbidden from further publication within China. The government kept her under surveillance and restricted her ability to travel. She was offered political asylum by the United States and Germany, but turned them both down. Instead, she wrote a book about her time in Qincheng titled My Imprisonment (我的入獄), which she was able to have published in Hong King and Taiwan. Her daughter graduated from Beijing University that year, but was denied further opportunities for study after she refused to formally denounce her mother.

In her book, she said, "What I can fight for is to let others know I am innocent but have a rebellious spirit."

As a former reporter for the Guangming Daily, she used to write frequently. However, her imprisonment after the publication of the Yangtze! Yangtze! made her change. In My Imprisonment, she declared she would no longer be a reporter. Since she was no longer a member of the Communist Party, she said, "They (the Communist Party) will probably give me up, but I will not be glad to work with them neither."

=== Later life ===
Dai Qing argues that China has not yet abolished the mode of collective society from the previous eras. Therefore, she continues to fight for human rights, democracy, and environmentalism along with people in both China and the West.

From 2003–2004, Dai Qing held the position of Weissberg Chair in Human Rights and Social Justice at Beloit College, spending time in residency on campus.

In 2009, Dai Qing and poet Bei Ling were scheduled to speak at a Frankfurt Book Fair event about contemporary issues in China. However, the event was jointly hosted with China (the book fair's guest of honour that year), and both writers were removed from the list of speakers after Chinese officials demanded their exclusion. Dai Qing told press she would be attending the fair even if she were not permitted to formally speak. The following year, after jailed human rights activist Liu Xiaobo was named a Nobel Peace Prize recipient, his wife Liu Xia asked other Chinese activists and dissidents to attend the award ceremony in support of him, and Dai Qing confirmed that she would be among those in attendance.

In 2016, Dai was still living in Shunyi, Beijing, and continuing to write.

In 2017, Dai went to Chiang Mai in Thailand where a friend invited her to stay, and she decided to move there permanently.

== Fellowships and awards ==
From 1991–1992, Dai Qing held a Nieman Fellowship at Harvard University. In recognition of work supporting freedom of the press, she received the 1992 Golden Pen of Freedom award from the World Association of News Publishers, and a PEN International Award. In 1993 she was awarded a Goldman Environmental Prize and the Condé Nast Traveler Environmental Award, and accepted a fellowship at the Columbia University School of Journalism. She used her time there to complete research for her book Wang Shiwei and "Wild Lilies": Reflection and Purges in the Chinese Communist Party, 1942–1944.

She held a fellowship at the Woodrow Wilson International Center from 1998–1999, and in 2007 she took up a year-long fellowship at Australian National University.

== Works ==
=== Books ===
1. No: A Collection of Short Stories (不 : 中短篇小說集) (1982)
2. Spring Story of the Red Rock (紅岩英魂逢春記) (Meng #Yong, Dai Qing, Li Jiajie/孟勇, 戴晴, 李家杰著){China-History-Civil War}(1983)
3. Spirit (魂){Collection of Articles} (1985)
4. Red Alert: Report of the Da Xing An Ling Forest Fires (紅色警報: 大興安嶺森林大火直擊報導) {Report}(1987)
5. Liang Shuming, Zhang Shizhao and Mao Zedong (梁漱溟,章士釗與毛澤東){China-Interllectual Life} (1988)
6. Series of the Chinese National Women (中國女性系列) {Report}(1988)
7. Readers' Questions and Answers (學者答問錄) {China-Interllectual-Interview}(1988)
8. Chasing the Devil and God (追逐魔鬼撾住上帝) {Collection of Articles}(1988)
9. Away from Modern Superstitions (走出現代迷信) (Tao Ling, Zhang Yide, Dai Qing et al./ 陶鎧, 張義德, 戴晴等著) {Philosophy, Marxist}(1988)
10. Sexually Open Women (性開放女子 ) (Dai Qing et al./ 戴晴等著){Chinese Fiction} (1988)
11. Yangtze! Yangtze! (揚子! 揚子!) {Reservoirs-China-Yangtze River-Environmental aspects}(1989)It was banned when it was first published in 1989 when the democracy movement in China became active. It is a collection of essays, interviews, statements, points of views and articles from Chinese scientists, environmentalists, journalists and intellectuals who all opposed the Three Gorges Dam scheme. Its credits lie in the fact that it successfully pressured the Chinese government to postpone the implementation of the scheme and it signaled as the first time which democratic movement could interfere with state decisions.
12. Chang Jiang, Chang Jiang: Arguments Regarding the Three Gorges Dam Project (長江長江 : 三峽工程論爭) (主編戴晴; 副主編剛建, 何小娜, 董郁玉 ){Dams-China-Yangtze River Gorges}(1989)
13. Whether to Continue with the Three Gorges Dam Project: Readers' Collection of Arguments (長江三峽工程應否興建 : 學者論爭文集) (主編戴晴; 副主編剛建, 何小娜, 董郁玉){Dams-China-Yangtze River Gorges}(1989)
14. China's Lack of Interest Regarding Sex: A Collection of Questions from the Mainland Society (中國的性苦悶 : 大陸社會問題紀實){Social Problems-China} (1989)
15. An Offering to the Heart(心祭) {Chinese Fiction}(1989)
16. Liang Shuming, Wang Shiwei, Chu Anping (梁漱溟, 王實味, 儲安平) {Intellectuals-China}(1989)
17. Away from Modern Superstitions: Arguments on Rational Questions (Chen Ling, Zhang Yide, Dai Qing et al.) (走出現代迷信: 關於真理標準問題的大辯論 / 陶鎧, 張義德, 戴晴等著) {Philosophy-Marxist}(1989)
18. My Imprisonment (我的入獄) {Political prisoners-China-Daires}(1990)
19. Mo Takuto to Chūgoku chishikijin: Enan seifu kara han uha toso e (毛澤東と中國知識人: 延安整風から反右派鬥爭) (1990)
20. Mao Zedong, Influencing the World, "Wild Lily" (毛澤東, 黨天下, 野百合花) (1991)
21. Sentimental Writing for Women (Dai Qing et al.) (齋女 : 女性感抒文學 / 戴晴等著) (1993)
22. Wang Shiwei and 'Wild Lilies': Rectification and Purges in the Chinese Communist Party (1942–1944) (王實味與野百合花) (1994)
23. My Account II of Imprisonment at Qin City (在秦城坐牢 : 自己的故事(二)) (1995) In this book, Dai talked about her life in prison and what she thought and saw there. Also, this book included what Dai wrote to her husband, daughter and the police at that time. And she talked about her opinion on the 1989 Tiananmen Square protests and massacre and her immigration problems when she went to the United States to study at Harvard University.
24. Women Who Keep Small Feet: Problems of the Women in Contemporary China (纏足女子 : 當代中國女性問題) (Dai Qing, Luo Ke/戴晴, 洛恪著)(1996) In this book, Dai and Luo give a message to the public. They want the society to pay attention to the problems of the women in China. There are seven chapters in this book spanning such subjects as women who persist in the practice of foot-binding, bigamy, a modern matchmaker and a girl who is raped at the age of nine. In this book, Dai shows herself a unique and critical view on current gender issues.
25. Whose Yangtze River: Can a Developing China be Responsible of the Three Gorges Dam Project (誰的長江 : 發展中的中國能否承擔三峽工程) (Dai Qing, Xue Weijia) (編者戴晴, 薛煒嘉) (1996)
26. The River Dragon Has Come! (水龍來了!) (1997) A book in which Dai Qing gave stern warning to prominent government officials, journalists, intellectuals and the public in China about the disastrous effect which the Three Gorges Dam project might bring to the environment and society of China. Dai Qing also gave a few suggestions on how to achieve the same goal with less catastrophic effects entailed.
27. Tiananmen Follies: Prison Memoirs and Other Writings (2003)
28. The Most Dammed Country in the World (2021) ISBN 9780241514597
29. Deng Xiaoping in 1989(邓小平在1989)(2024) ISBN 9798869345585

=== Articles ===
1. (with Jeanne Tai), "Raised Eyebrows for Raise the Red Lantern," Public Culture 5(2): 333-337 (1993).
2. Members of Falungong in an Autocratic Society 2000: Dai Qing contended that China was still based on the mode of collective idea of the previous era. While the members of Falungong gathered together to cultivate their own ideas and worshipped their own god, the Chinese government saw it as a kind a deviation. She criticized the Chinese government for deploying the usual tactics of suppression to crush against Falungong members. Dai claimed that this event represents the greatest conflicts when China steps towards modernity. This article is based on her lecture at the Fairbank Center, Harvard University on November 18, 1999.

== See also ==
- List of Chinese women writers
- Mass media in China
- Women’s roles during the Tiananmen Square Protests of 1989
