= Empress Yide (Song dynasty) =

Chinese Emperess (929 AD - 958 AD)

Princess Fu 苻氏
- Born: 941; Huaiyang District, China
- Died: 975 (aged 33–34)
- Burial: Gongyi, Henan, China
- Spouse: Emperor Taizong
Posthumous name
- Empress Yide (懿德皇后)
- Father: Fu Yanqing (符彥卿)

Princess Fu (苻氏, given name unknown, 941–975), posthumously known as Empress Yide, was the wife of Zhao Guangyi, the future Song dynasty emperor. She was one of the many daughters of general Fu Yanqing, and along with her sisters, Empress Fu the Elder and Empress Dowager Fu (Later Zhou), (both married to the Later Zhou emperor Chai Rong), she played an important role in Chinese politics of the 10th century.

== Life ==
Princess Fu was born in 941 as the sixth daughter of Fu Yanqing.

During the reign of Chai Rong, Lady Fu married Zhao Guangyi. They never had any children. Not much is known about Princess Fu. She died before the enthronement of Zhao Guangyi. Lady Fu was posthumously awarded the title of Empress.

== Titles ==
- During the reign of Emperor Gaozu of Later Jin (28 November 936 – 28 July 942):
  - Lady Fu (苻氏; from 941)
- During the reign of Emperor Taizu of Song (4 February 960– 14 November 976):
  - Lady of Runan County (汝南郡夫人; from 960/963)
  - Lady of Chu State (楚國夫人, from unknown date)
  - Lady of Yue State (越國夫人; after 960)
- During the reign of Emperor Taizong of Song (15 November 976 – 8 May 997)
  - Empress Yide (懿德皇后; from november 976)
