= Fu Yanqing =

Chinese general and politician

Fu Yanqing / Li Yanqing

Personal details
- Born: 898 likely modern Shanxi
- Died: July 31, 975 modern Luoyang, Henan
- Children: Fu Zhaoxin (符昭信); Empress Xuanyi; Empress Fu; Empress Yide; Fu Zhaoyuan (符昭願); Fu Zhaoshou (符昭壽)
- Occupation: Military general, monarch, politician
- Father: Li Cunshen (Fu Cun)
- Full name: Surname: Lǐ (李) after father's adoptive father, later reverted to father's original surname Fú (符); Given name: Yànqīng (彥卿); Courtesy name: Guànhóu (冠侯)
- Nickname: "The Fourth Fu" (符第四)

Fu Yanqing
- Traditional Chinese: 符彥卿
- Simplified Chinese: 符彦卿
Transcriptions
Standard Mandarin
- Hanyu Pinyin: Fú Yànqīng
- Wade–Giles: Fu^{2} Yen^{4}-ch'ing^{1}

Fu Yanqing (符彥卿) (898 – July 31, 975), né Li Yanqing (李彥卿), courtesy name Guanhou (冠侯), formally the Prince of Wei (魏王), nicknamed Fu Disi (符第四; "the fourth Fu"), was a Chinese general and politician during the Five Dynasties and Ten Kingdoms period (Later Tang, Later Jin, Later Han, and Later Zhou states, as well as the Liao dynasty and Song dynasty). He was one of the most celebrated generals of the period, and he was also the father of three empresses — two as successive empresses of the Later Zhou emperor Chai Rong, and one (posthumously) as a wife of Zhao Guangyi, who would become the second emperor of the Song dynasty. His father was the general Li Cunshen, an adoptive son of the late-Tang warlord Li Keyong.

== Background ==
Li Yanqing was born in 898, near the end of the Tang dynasty, during the reign of Emperor Zhaozong of Tang. His father, then known as Li Cunshen but who was born with the name of Fu Cun, was an adoptive son of and general under the major late-Tang warlord Li Keyong the Prince of Jin. Li Yanqing was said to be the fourth-born son of Li Cunshen's, but only the identities of two of his older brothers, Li Yanchao (李彥超) and Li Yanrao (李彥饒), were recorded in history; he also had at least two younger brothers, Li Yanneng (李彥能) and Li Yanlin (李彥琳). (All four of his known brothers would eventually serve as generals.)

When Li Yanqing was 12 — i.e., in 910 — by which time Tang had fallen and the Jin realm, theoretically still under Tang rule, was actually under the rule of Li Keyong's biological son and successor Li Cunxu — Li Yanqing, who was already capable of riding and archery, entered military service under Li Cunxu, being close enough to Li Cunxu that he was allowed to enter the prince's bedchamber. When he grew older, he became an officer in Li Cunxu's army. Also in his youth, he became a friend of Shi Chonggui, the nephew of Shi Jingtang, the son-in-law of Li Siyuan, also an adoptive son of Li Keyong's. (However, while this was traditionally described as such in official accounts, Shi Chonggui, born in 914, was 16 years younger than Li Yanqing.)

== During Later Tang ==
In 923, Li Cunxu claimed imperial title as the emperor of a new Later Tang, and shortly after conquered his southern rival Later Liang and took over its territory. Li Yanqing continued to serve as an officer of Li Cunxu's imperial guards.

In 924, Li Yanqing's father Li Cunshen died, while serving as the military governor (Jiedushi) of Lulong Circuit (盧龍, headquartered in modern Beijing).

In 926, many mutinies were occurring against Li Cunxu's rule. Eventually, a mutiny even rose at the capital Luoyang itself, and it was said that when the mutiny occurred, the officers and soldiers were deserting Li Cunxu in droves, with only some 10-20 officers/soldiers, including Li Yanqing, remaining with Li Cunxu and fighting the mutineers. During the battle, Li Cunxu was hit by a stray arrow, and eventually died from that injury. Upon seeing Li Cunxu's death, Li Yanqing and the others cried and then left the area. The army of Li Siyuan (who had previously rebelled against Li Cunxu) arrived at Luoyang shortly after, and Li Siyuan claimed imperial title. Li Yanqing's older brother Li Yanchao, who was then the defender of the northern capital Taiyuan, submitted to Li Siyuan's rule shortly after; presumably, so did Li Yanqing. In 927, Li Yanchao requested to change his surname to his father's original surname of Fu, and Li Siyuan granted that request; presumably, Li Yanqing and his other brothers also changed their name at that time.

In 928, when Li Siyuan ordered a general campaign against the rebellious Wang Du, the military governor of Yiwu Circuit (義武, headquartered in modern Baoding, Hebei), Fu Yanqing, who then carried the titles of the commander of the Longwu Corps and prefect of Ji Prefecture (吉州, in modern Ji'an, Jiangxi) (an honorary title, as Ji Prefecture was then under the rule of Later Tang's southeastern neighbor Wu), served on the campaign against Wang. When the army of the Khitan Empire tried to aid Wang, Fu participated in the great Later Tang victory over Khitan forces at Mount Jia (嘉山, near Yiwu's capital Ding Prefecture (定州)), which eventually led to Ding's falling and Wang's suicide. After the campaign, Fu was made the military prefect (團練使, Tuanlianshi) of Yao Prefecture (耀州, in modern Tongchuan, Shaanxi). He was later made the prefect of Qing Prefecture (慶州, in modern Qingyang, Gansu) and, at imperial direction, built a fort to try to entice Dangxiang tribesmen to submit to Later Tang.

Early in the Qingtai era (934-936) of Li Siyuan's adoptive son and successor Li Congke, Fu was made the prefect of Yi Prefecture (易州, in modern Baoding), and put in command of the cavalry soldiers on the borders with the Khitan Empire. There was a time when he went hunting that, within a day, he killed 42 animals — deer, pigs, wolves, foxes, and rabbits — impressing the people who witnessed the feat.

In 936, Shi Jingtang, then the military governor of Hedong Circuit (河東, headquartered at Taiyuan), rebelled against Li Congke. He sought aid from Khitan's Emperor Taizong. Li Congke sent an army, commanded by Zhang Jingda, to attack Shi. Fu was one of the generals serving under Zhang. Zhang quickly put Taiyuan under siege. However, when the Liao army, commanded by Emperor Taizong himself, thereafter arrived at Taiyuan, the Liao army attacked and defeated the Later Tang army despite the efforts of Fu and Gao Xingzhou. The Later Tang army was forced to take up defensive position at Jin'an Base (晉安寨, near Taiyuan), and shortly after became surrounded by the Liao/Hedong army. Several times Fu and Gao tried to fight out of the encirclement, but could not. Eventually, Zhang's deputy Yang Guangyuan assassinated Zhang and surrendered the Later Tang army to the Liao/Hedong army, the control over which Emperor Taizong then transferred to Shi. Thereafter, Emperor Taizong created Shi the emperor of a new Later Jin. Fu became a subject of Later Jin's. Shortly after, with Shi's army approaching Luoyang, Li Congke committed suicide, ending Later Tang.

== During Later Jin ==
Early in Shi Jingtang's reign, Fu Yanqing was made the military governor of Kuangguo Circuit (匡國, headquartered in modern Weinan, Shaanxi). In 937, Fu Yanqing's older brother Fu Yanrao, who was then serving as the military governor of Yicheng Circuit (義成, headquartered in modern Anyang, Henan), got into a conflict with another military governor, Bai Fengjin (白奉進), and while they argued, Fu Yanrao's soldiers killed Bai. This assassination was subsequently blamed on Fu Yanrao, and Fu Yanrao was captured and executed. While Shi then issued an edict stating that Fu Yanrao's brothers would not also be punished, Fu Yanqing nevertheless submitted a resignation, which Shi declined. However, he did recall Fu Yanqing to serve as a general of the imperial guards, but later sent him back out of the capital to serve as the military governor of Baoda Circuit (保大, headquartered in modern Yan'an, Shaanxi).

In 942, Shi Jingtang died, and Shi Chonggui succeeded him as emperor. Having been friendly with Fu since their youth, he recalled Fu from Baoda and thereafter made him the military governor of Heyang Circuit (河陽, headquartered in modern Jiaozuo, Henan), close to the capital Kaifeng. With Shi Chonggui taking a hostile tone in his relationship with Khitan (which had been renamed Liao), Emperor Taizong made a major invasion into Later Jin territory in 944 to aid Yang Guangyuan, who had rebelled against Shi's rule from his post at Pinglu Circuit (平盧, headquartered in modern Weifang, Shandong). Fu was one of the generals whose armies were mobilized to resist the Liao invasion, and there was a time when he, Gao Xingzhou, and Shi Gongba (石公霸) were surrounded by Liao forces, such that they almost were captured, but Fu fought valiantly; subsequently, when Shi Chonggui himself arrived with a relief force, they were saved. When eventually, with Pinglu's capital Qing Prefecture (青州) under siege, Yang's son Yang Chengxun (楊承勳) arrested his father and surrendered, Fu was rewarded with the title of Duke of Qi, and was moved to Zhongwu Circuit (忠武, headquartered in modern Xuchang, Henan).

On a subsequently Khitan invasion in 945, the Later Jin army, then under the command of Du Wei and Li Shouzhen, encountered the Liao army near Yangcheng (陽城, in modern Baoding) and became surrounded. Du panicked and was reluctant to engage the Liao army, but at Fu's advocacy, he, Zhang Yanze, Yao Yuanfu (藥元福), and Huangfu Yu (皇甫遇), attacked the Liao army fiercely, causing the Liao army to panic and flee. For his accomplishment, Shi, who then moved him to Wuning Circuit (武寧, headquartered in modern Xuzhou, Jiangsu), bestowed on him the honorary chancellor designation Tong Zhongshu Menxia Pingzhangshi (同中書門下平章事).

However, Fu was later falsely accused by Shi's close associates, and when Shi launched a major attack against Liao under the command of Du and Li Shouzhen in 946, Fu was not ordered to participate — only his soldiers were. He was instead given a few thousand weaker soldiers and stayed near Kaifeng. Only when Du and Li Shouzhen subsequently become surrounded by Emperor Taizong at Zhongdu Bridge (中度橋, in modern Baoding), did Shi summon Gao and Fu and tried to have them serve as a line of defense. When Du and Li Shouzhen then surrendered to Liao, however, the way for Liao to attack Kaifeng became clear, and Emperor Taizong had Zhang Yanze, who also surrendered to Liao, head directly to Kaifeng to capture it. Finding the situation hopeless, Shi surrendered, ending Later Jin. Gao and Fu also went to Emperor Taizong's headquarters to surrender. Emperor Taizong rebuked Fu for having defeated him at Yangcheng. Fu responded, "I, your subject, at that time only knew that I should serve the Lord of Jin with all my heart. Whether I live or die is up to you." Emperor Taizong laughed and released him.

== During the Liao occupation ==
Emperor Taizong shortly after claimed to be emperor of China as well, and initially, nearly all of the Later Jin realm submitted to him. However, he allowed Liao soldiers to pillage the countryside, and many rebellions against his rule quickly rose. With his having kept the Later Jin military governors at Kaifeng, the rebellions initially went unchecked. When the rebellions became particularly rampant to the east, he allowed Fu Yanqing to return to Wuning and An Shenqi (安審琦) the military governor of Taining Circuit (泰寧, headquartered in Jining, Shandong), to return to their circuits. When Fu approached Wuning's capital Xu Prefecture (徐州), though, the rebel leader Li Renshu (李仁恕), seized him, and tried to use him to get his son Fu Zhaoxu (符昭序), whom he had left in charge at Xu, to open the gates. Fu Zhaoxu, however, refused to open the gates. When Li saw this, he apologized to Fu Yanqing and begged forgiveness. After Fu Yanqing swore not to punish him and the others, they released him and lifted the siege.

Not long after, Emperor Taizong, tired of dealing with Han Chinese rebellions, chose to withdraw back to Liao proper, but died on the way. After a succession struggle, his nephew Yelü Ruan the Prince of Yongkang took control of the throne (as Emperor Shizong). With Han rebellions overrunning the former Later Jin lands and with his own succession being challenged by his grandmother Empress Dowager Shulü, Emperor Shizong did not try to retain control of most of the former Later Jin lands, and what he did hold was lost shortly after. Chief among the Han Chinese resistance was the army led by Liu Zhiyuan the military governor of Hedong, who declared himself the emperor of a new Later Han, which would receive recognition from most of the former Later Jin territory.

== During Later Han ==
After Liu Zhiyuan entered Kaifeng, Fu Yanqing went to Kaifeng to pay homage to him as emperor. Liu transferred him to Taining Circuit and gave him the greater honorary chancellor title of Shizhong (侍中).

In 948, Liu Zhiyuan died and was succeeded by his son Liu Chengyou as emperor. Immediately after Liu Chengyou's succession to the throne, the officials that Liu Zhiyuan entrusted Liu Chengyou to, pursuant to instructions that Liu Zhiyuan left, executed Du Chongwei (i.e., Du Wei — he was known as Du Wei during Later Jin to observe naming taboo for Shi Chonggui). In fear, Li Shouzhen, who was friendly with Du and who was then the military governor of Huguo Circuit (護國, headquartered in modern Yuncheng, Shanxi), rebelled. The Later Han imperial government sent the chief of staff Guo Wei to attack Li, and Guo, after sieging Huguo's capital Hezhong Municipality (河中), captured it in fall 949. Li Shouzhen and his family committed suicide by fire — but a daughter of Fu's, whom he had given in marriage to Li's son Li Chongxun (李崇勳), escaped this mass suicide by hiding herself. Guo had her escorted back to Fu's house.

In 950, Fu went to Kaifeng to pay homage to Li Chengxun. He was thereafter moved to Pinglu Circuit, and given the honorary chancellor title Zhongshu Ling (中書令); he was also created the Duke of Wei.

Later in 950, Liu Chengyou, displeased that the officials Liu Zhiyuan entrusted to were continuing to control the governance, making him feel that he was being ignored, had three of them — Guo's colleague as chief of staff, Yang Bin; the commanding general of the imperial guards, Shi Hongzhao; and the overseer of the financial agencies, Wang Zhang — killed. He also sent secret emissaries to Yedu (鄴都, in modern Handan, Hebei), where Guo Wei was at the time, to kill Guo, but the news leaked, and Guo was able to escape death, although his family members remaining at Kaifeng were killed. Anticipating a reaction from Guo, Liu Chengyou summoned a number of senior generals, including Fu, Gao Xingzhou, Guo Congyi (郭從義), Murong Yanchao (Liu Zhiyuan's half-brother), and Xue Huairang (薛懷讓) to the capital, apparently hoping that they would support him in a potential operation against Guo Wei. There was no record of how Fu reacted to the summons. Guo Wei quickly advanced south from Yedu to Kaifeng, and when his army encountered the imperial army, the imperial army was crushed. Liu Chengyou was killed in the confusion, and Guo entered the capital. After initially acting as if he was going to support Liu Zhiyuan's adoptive son (and biological nephew) Liu Yun as emperor, Guo seized the throne himself, establishing Later Zhou as its emperor.

== During Later Zhou ==
After taking the throne, Guo Wei created Fu Yanqing the Prince of Huaiyang. He also awarded the Kaifeng mansion of Liu Chengyou's close associate Liu Zhu (劉銖), whom he had executed, to Fu. Further, later that year or shortly after, he had his adoptive son (the biological nephew of his deceased wife Lady Chai), Guo Rong, marry Fu's daughter (Li Chongxun's widow) as wife.

In 952, Murong Yanchao, then at Taining, rebelled against Later Zhou. When Guo personally attacked Murong, Fu went to pay homage to him at the imperial camp, offering horses, silk, and food supplies for the imperial army. After Murong was defeated, Fu was moved to Tianping Circuit (天平, headquartered in modern Tai'an, Shandong). Guo was initially intending to further move him to Yedu to serve as the military governor of Tianxiong Circuit (天雄, headquartered at Yedu), but at that time, there was a Liao incursion, and he did not want to move Tianxiong's military governor Wang Jun, and so that did not happen. It was not until 953, when Wang offended Guo Wei and was forced into retirement that Fu was made the military governor of Tianxiong and the mayor of Daming (大名, i.e., Yedu); he was also created the Prince of Wei (衛王, a different title than the one he will eventually carry at death).

Guo Wei died in 954, and Guo Rong succeeded him as emperor. Shortly after, Liu Zhiyuan's brother Liu Min, who had claimed imperial title and claimed to be the lawful successor to the Later Han throne (but whose state was generally historically referred to separately as Northern Han), tried to take advantage of the Later Zhou imperial succession by attacking south from his capital Taiyuan. Guo Rong personally led the imperial forces against Liu Min, but also ordered a number of other generals, including Fu, to attack Northern Han on the flanks, with the assignment of Fu and his deputy Guo Chong the military governor of Zhenning Circuit (鎮寧, headquartered in modern Anyang) to attack toward Taiyuan through Ci Prefecture (磁州, in modern Handan). When Guo Rong himself shortly after defeated Liu Min at Gaoping (高平, in modern Jincheng, Shanxi) and forced Liu to flee back to Taiyuan, Guo commissioned Fu as the overall commander against Northern Han (with Guo Chong still serving as deputy). He initially only intended to have Fu advance to Taiyuan, show the Later Zhou power to inhibit another future Northern Han attack, and then withdraw. However, once the Later Zhou army was in Northern Han territory and enjoying successes, he changed his mind and wanted Fu to destroy Northern Han. Fu thus put Taiyuan under siege, and Guo Rong himself joined the siege shortly after. However, when Liao forces were subsequently launched to aid Northern Han, and Later Zhou forces did not fare well in small scale encounters with the Liao forward troops, Later Zhou lifted the siege and withdrew. Despite the failure to capture Taiyuan, Guo still greatly rewarded Fu. After Guo returned to Kaifeng, he bestowed the title of Taifu (太傅) on Fu, and created him the Prince of Wei (魏王).

Also in 954, Guo Rong created Fu's daughter empress. She died in 956. In 959, Guo created her younger sister, also a daughter of Fu's, as the new empress. (She thus became known historically as Empress Dowager Fu (Later Zhou), while the older empress became known as Empress Fu the Elder.) Guo himself died shortly after, and was succeeded by his young son Guo Zongxun. (It is not clear from historical accounts whether Guo Zongxun was the son of Empress Fu the Elder's.) (Another daughter of Fu's — his sixth daughter — married Zhao Guangyi, the younger brother of the major general Zhao Kuangyin, sometime during Guo Rong's reign; she was younger than Empress Fu the Elder, although it is not clear whether she was older or younger than Empress Dowager Fu (Later Zhou).) After Guo Zongxun took the throne, Fu received the title of Taiwei (太尉).

== During Song ==
In 960, Zhao Kuangyin seized power in a coup, ending Later Zhou and starting a new Song dynasty as its Emperor Taizu. He gave Fu Yanqing the honorary title of Taishi (太師).

Meanwhile, during the years that Fu was at Tianxiong, he left much of the governance to an administrator, Liu Siyu (劉思遇). Liu was said to be greedy, and was often finding ways to enrich himself with the tax funds he received from the people, with Fu not realizing it. Further, at that time, regional governments were often engaging in the practice of using unfair weights and measures in collecting taxes (when, for example, the people were using grain to pay their taxes), and Tianxiong was said to be one of the circuits that was particularly worst in this regard. Hearing of this, Emperor Taizu sent imperial administrators to Tianxiong to oversee taxation; Emperor Taizu also took the "surplus" from the past and awarded it to Fu, to make him ashamed. It was also said that Fu favored eagles and dogs, such that if his subordinates had committed faults, they would try to placate him by obtaining good eagles and dogs to offer to him, such that no matter how angry he was, he would be calmed. He was also described to not like drinking, and was humble to those who came to see him.

In 963, Fu went to Kaifeng to pay homage to the Song emperor. Emperor Taizu held a feast in his honor, and they spent time shooting arrows. He considered keeping Fu at Kaifeng to command the imperial army. The chief of staff Zhao Pu opposed, arguing that Fu had such great reputation that he might pose a risk as commander. When Emperor Taizu responded, "Why do you, sir, suspect Fu Yanqing? We have treated Fu Yanqing so well; how could Fu Yanqing turn against us?" Zhao Pu responded, "How could Your Imperial Majesty turn against Emperor Shizong of Zhou [(i.e., Guo Rong)]?" Emperor Taizu fell silent, and did not give the command to Fu; Fu subsequently returned to Tianxiong. As Fu's governance of the circuit was believed to be lacking, Emperor Taizu subsequently commissioned several lower level imperial officials known for their talent to serve as county magistrates in Fu's realm.

In 969, again believing Fu to be ineffective as a governor, Emperor Taizu moved him to Fengxiang Circuit (鳳翔, headquartered in modern Baoji, Shaanxi). When Fu reached Luoyang, he claimed to be ill and asked to be allowed to remain there until recovery. Emperor Taizu initially agreed, but Fu remained there for 100 days without any signs of getting ready to depart for Fengxiang. The imperial censors indicted him for dereliction of duty, but Emperor Taizu, citing the marital relationship between his family and Fu's, did not punish Fu, but relieved him of the Fengxiang command. Fu thereafter settled at Luoyang. It was said that he was accustomed to ride ponies in the spring to sightsee at the temples and gardens at Luoyang, enjoying retirement.

Fu died in 975. He was given posthumous honors, and his funeral expenses were paid for by the imperial treasury.

== Notes and references ==
- History of Song, vol. 251.
- Zizhi Tongjian, vols. 275, 280, 283, 284, 285, 286, 288, 289, 291, 292.
- Xu Zizhi Tongjian, vols. 1, 2, 3, 6, 8.
