= Fu Kuan =

Fu Kuan (Chinese: 傅寬; Wade–Giles: Fu K'uan) (died 190 BC) was a Marquis of Yangling; now Gaoling, Shaanxi.

Fu Kuan was an early follower of Liu Bang, beginning in Hengyang. Fu became a general while accompanying Liu in the conquest of Guanzhong in 206 BC. He served under Han Xin during the conquest of Qi in 204 BC.

In December of 202 BC, Liu Bei made Fu the Marquis of Yangling, ruling over 2,600 peasant households.

== See also ==
- Fu (surname)
