= Fu Jiezi =

Fu Jiezi (Chinese: 傅介子; Wade–Giles: Fu Chieh-tzu; died 65 BCE), born in Qingyang, Gansu, was responsible for the assassination of the Loulan king Angui in 77 BC.

== Career ==
Although fond of study, at fourteen years of age he threw his writing-tablets aside, saying with a sigh, “Tis in foreign lands that a hero must seek renown; how can I let my life pass away as an old bookworm?”

The rulers of the Loulan countries had killed some Chinese envoys. In 77 BC, Fu Jiezi advised supreme general Huo Guang, "Loulan and Qiuci have repeatedly betrayed us without punishment, setting no examplea... let me assassinate him to intimidate the other states.". Huo Guang then laid before Emperor Zhao of Han a plan for sending Fu, then inspector of the stables at P'ing-lo Palace, to go out and assassinate the king of Loulan.

Fu volunteered to proceed as envoy to Ferghana or Khokand. He carried with him gold and silk, and claimed it was a gift for the King of Loulan. The king was delighted; and he became intoxicated while drinking with Fu, who now took the king aside for a private word. Two of his guards followed and stabbed the king to death, and all his noblemen and attendants fled in confusion. Fu proclaimed the following message of admonition from the Han emperor: “The Son of Heaven has sent me to punish the king, by reason of his crime in turning against Han. It is fitting that in his place you should enthrone his younger brother Weituqi who is a present in Han. Han troops are about to arrive here; do not dare to make any move which would result in yourselves bringing about the destruction of your state.” Fu then beheaded the king of Loulan and sent his head by mounted messenger service to the palace, where it was suspended at the Northern Tower. The kingdom of Loulan was then renamed by the Han court to Shanshan and appointed to the assassinated king's brother.

Fu was then invested with the title of Noble of Yiyang. Fu died in Yuankang in 65 BC.

== See also ==
- Fu (surname)
- Han–Xiongnu War
- Loulan Kingdom
- Shanshan
