= Fu Yi =

Politician of the Sui and Tang dynasties

- 傅奕
- Born: 554
- Died: 639
- Occupations: Historian, Philosopher, Politician, Historiographer
- Era: Sui dynasty, Tang dynasty

Fu Yi (Chinese: 傅奕; pinyin: Fù Yì; Wade–Giles: Fu I; 554−639) was a Chinese historian, philosopher, and politician during the Sui dynasty who later became historiographer during the reign of Emperor Gaozu of the Tang dynasty.

He presented a memorial asking that Buddhism might be abolished; and when Xiao Yu questioned him on the subject, he said, “You were not born in a hollow mulberry-tree; yet you respect a religion which does not recognize the tie between father and son!” He urged that at any rate priests and nuns should be compelled to marry and bring up families, and not escape from contributing their share to the revenue, adding that Xiao Yu by defending their doctrines showed himself no better than they were. At this time Xiao Yu held up his hands, and declared that hell was made for such men as Fu Yi. The result was that severe restrictions were placed for a short time upon teachers of Buddhism.

Emperor Taizong of Tang once got hold of a Tartar priest who could “charm people into unconsciousness, and then charm them back to life again,” and spoke of his powers to Fu Yi. The latter said confidently, “He will not be able to charm me;” and when put to the test, the priest completely failed. He was the originator of epitaphs, and wrote his own, as follows: -- "Fu Yi loved the green hills and the white clouds. Alas! He died of drink."
