= Fu Haitao =

Chinese triple jumper (born 1993)

Medal record

Men's athletics

Representing China

East Asian Games
Gold medal – first place	2013 Tianjin	Triple jump

Asian Indoor Championships
Gold medal – first place	2014 Hangzhou	Triple jump

Fu Haitao (Chinese: 傅海涛; born 13 January 1993) is a Chinese track and field athlete who competes in the triple jump. Fu was the gold medallist at the 2013 East Asian Games and the Asian Indoor Athletics Championships in 2014. He also finished in the top two at the 2010 Youth Olympics and the 2012 Asian Junior Athletics Championships. His personal best is 16.56 m (54 ft 3 3/4 in).

== Career ==
Born in Fujian, he competed in jumping events in his youth and set bests of 7.03 m (23 ft 3/4 in) and 15.05 m (49 ft 4 1/2 in) in the long and triple jump to finish in the top two at the 2008 Chinese High School Championships. He cleared sixteen metres in the triple jump for the first time in 2009, en route to winning the Chinese High School Games title. In his first international competition, he cleared a personal best of 16.14 m (52 ft 11 1/4 in) to take second place at the 2010 Youth Olympics, finishing behind Cuban Radame Fabar. He ended that year having improved his best mark to 16.33 m (53 ft 6 3/4 in).

He competed only nationally in 2011 and he competed a long/triple jump double at the Chinese junior championships. His best performances came at the Chinese City Games, where he cleared 7.89 m (25 ft 10 1/2 in) to take bronze in the long jump and leaped 16.56 m (54 ft 3 3/4 in) to win the triple jump title – the latter mark ranked him third in the world that year among junior athletes. The following year he failed to improve upon these marks, but his best jump of the year at 16.38 m (53 ft 8 3/4 in) was enough to win the gold medal at the 2012 Asian Junior Athletics Championships. He was among the top qualifiers at the 2012 World Junior Championships in Athletics, but managed only seventh place in the final.

Fu took his first senior medals in 2013, first a triple jump bronze medal at the 12th National Games of China, then a gold medal at the 2013 East Asian Games, where he defeated the reigning Asian champion Cao Shuo. He began the next year by winning his first continental title, taking the gold at the 2014 Asian Indoor Athletics Championships in Hangzhou with an indoor best of 16.21 m (53 ft 2 in).
