= Fu An =

Ming diplomat active from 1395 to 1429

- Born: ?
- Died: 1429
- Occupation: diplomat

Fu An (Chinese: 傅安; fl. 1395–1429) was a Ming dynasty diplomat, who was dispatched in 1395 with two other officials and a eunuch named Liu Wei, to open communications with the nations of Central Asia. They traversed the desert of Gobi and reached Hami; thence on to Karakhoja and Ilbalik, the ancient capital of Kuldja. Their mission was successful as far as Samarkand, the various places visited acknowledging the suzerainty of China. There however they were imprisoned by Timur until 1407 as Timur attempted to attack the Ming dynasty. The survivors, including only 17 of their original escort of 1,500 men, were then sent back after Timur's death and were all rewarded on arrival. Fu An and his companions went on six missions altogether, chiefly to Samarkand, Beshbalik and Herat, until in 1415 Fu An retired to wait on his aged mother.
