= Xiaolan Fu =

Chinese economist

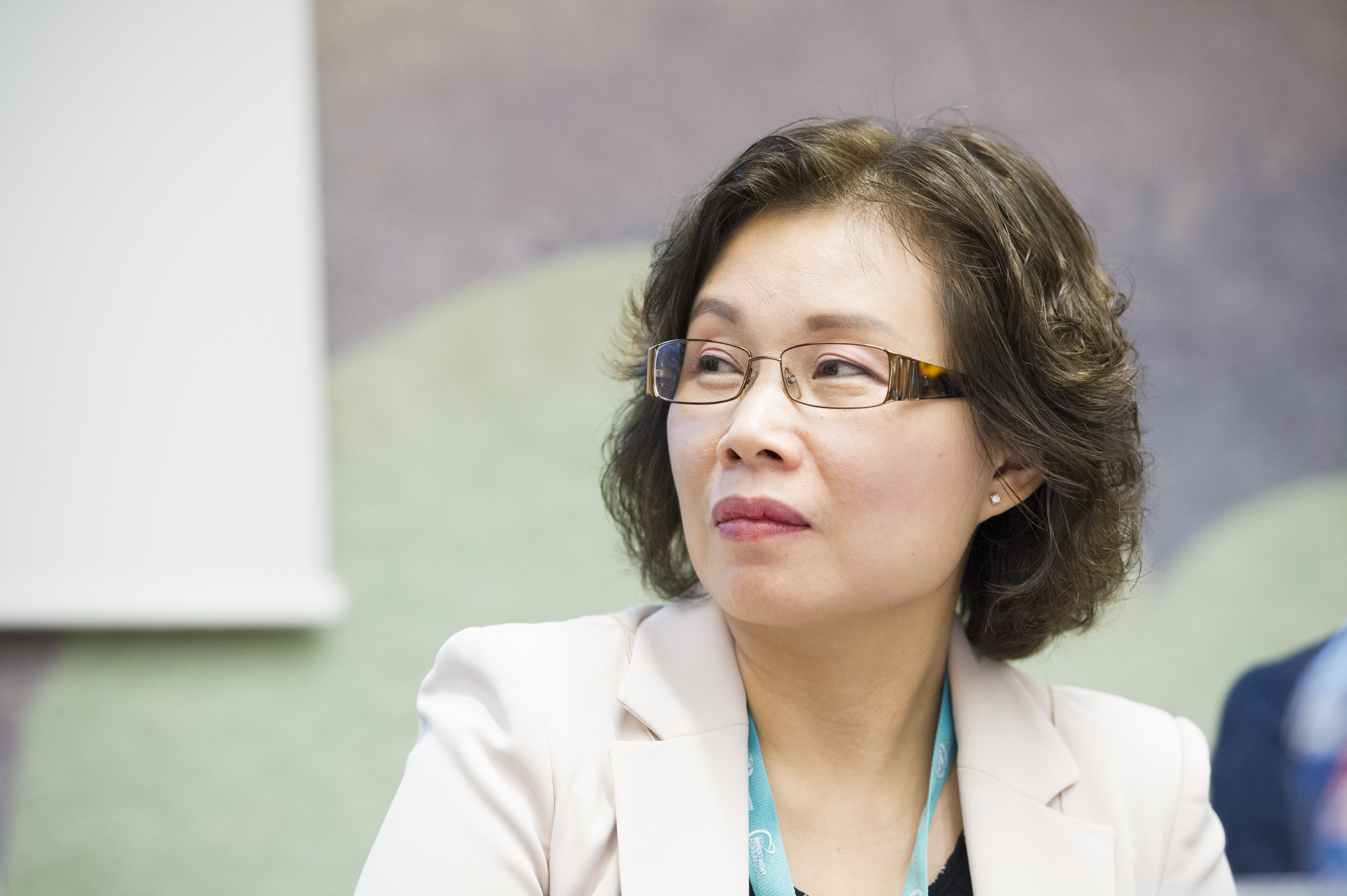
- Professor Xiaolan Fu at the World Investment Forum 2018
- Born: 17 August 1967 (age 59); China

Academic background
- Education: Lancaster University Management School

Academic work
- Discipline: Development Economics, Technology, Innovation, Trade, FDI
- Institutions: University of Cambridge; University of Oxford (ODID), Green Templeton College; Fudan University; Tsinghua University

Xiaolan Fu (Chinese: 傅晓岚; pinyin: Fù Xiǎolán) is a British-based Chinese economist, and Fellow of the Academy of Social Sciences. She is the founding director of the Centre of Technology and Industrialisation for Development, professor of technology and international development, fellow of Green Templeton College at the University of Oxford, and founder of OxValue.AI.

== Life ==
Xiaolan Fu was born in China on 17 August 1967, and she came with her family to the UK for post-graduate studies at Lancaster University. She completed her master's degree in a year and attained her economics doctorate in 2003. She wrote her thesis on the economics of her home country under the supervision of Vudayagi Balasubramanyam.

She was appointed by the Ban Ki-moon of the United Nations to the Ten-Member High Level Advisory Group of the UN Technology Facilitation Mechanism and to the Governing Council of the UN's Technology Bank for Least Developed Countries. She currently serves on the UN High-Level Advisory Board on Economic and Social Affairs, convened by the United Nations Department of Economic and Social Affairs. She is a member of the Leadership Council of the UN Sustainable Development Solutions Network (SDSN-SEA).

== Appointments ==
In 2024, Fu was appointed as the director of Oxford Advanced Research Centres by the University of Oxford, which wholly owns the Oxford Suzhou Centre for Advanced Research.

Fu has been appointed as member of the scientific board of the Global Network for Economics of Learning, Innovation, and Competence Building Systems, member of the high-level group of the International Science Council, and has been a consultant for UNDESA, UNCTAD, UNIDO, the World Bank, OECD, European Commission, ILO, the Commonwealth Secretariat, and UK Trade & Investment. She has served on the Advisory Expert Group of the OECD Global Investment Forum and the DFID/ESRC Economic Growth Directorate (DEGP), and was president of the Chinese Economic Association (Europe) and CEA (UK) in 2010–2011. She has served on the Management Committee of the Oxford University China Centre since 2015. She is a Senior Research Associate at the University of Cambridge, a Visiting Professorial Fellow at the Chinese Academy of Sciences, and an Honorary Professor at the University of Malaya. She held visiting fellowships at Tsinghua University, Fudan University, and the Chinese Academy of Social Sciences.

Her research interests include innovation, technology and industrialisation; trade, foreign direct investment and economic development; emerging economies; digital transformation and the implications of AI for development.

She has published in international journals, independently or in collaboration with others. Her books include China's ‘Everything Online’ Company: The Unique Innovation Model of Tencent (2026), Oxford Handbook of China Innovation (2021), Innovation under the Radar (2020), China's Path to Innovation (2015), China's Role in Global Economic Recovery (2011) and The Rise of Technological Power in the South (2010). She was Editor-in-Chief of the Journal of Chinese Economic and Business Studies and serves on the editorial boards of R&D Management, Industrial and Corporate Change, International Journal of Technology Management, and nine other international journals.

Fu received research grants from funding bodies including the European Commission, ESRC, EPSRC, British Academy, DFID, and the Cairncross Foundation.

== Media presence ==
She has participated in various interviews and panel discussions at mainstream media including BBC, Sky News, CCTV, CGTN, People's Daily, and China Daily. In 2014, she was invited to address the UN General Assembly on 'Science, technology and innovation in developing countries'.

Fu had a large presence in the media in regards to the COVID-19 pandemic and its effects on the world's economic climate in the present and future. She began these interactions shortly after the pandemic began and continued until her last interview published under her University of Oxford staff biography. Fu focused mainly on the short and long-term effects of the COVID-19 pandemic on international trade and various innovations that will take place as a result.

== Selected publications ==
=== Books and monographs ===
- Fu, Xiaolan (with J Chen & B McKern) (Eds)(2021). The Oxford Handbook of China Innovation, Oxford University Press.
- Fu, Xiaolan (2020) Innovation Under the Radar: The Nature and Sources of Innovation in Africa, Cambridge University Press.
- Fu, Xiaolan (2015) China's Path to Innovation, Cambridge University Press. (Monograph)
- Fu, Xiaolan (ed) (2011) China's Role in Global Economic Recovery, Routledge. Translated into Chinese and published by Yilin Press in 2012.
- Fu, Xiaolan (with Luc Soete) (eds) (2010) The Rise of Technological Power in the South, Basingstoke: Palgrave Macmillan.
- Fu, Xiaolan (with A Cosh, A Hughes, R De Hoyos, A Eisingerich) (2006) Experiences of UK Mid-corporate Companies in Emerging Asian Economies, UK Trade & Investment
- Fu, Xiaolan (2004) Exports, Foreign Direct Investment and Economic Development in China, London and New York: Palgrave Macmillan. (Monograph)

=== Articles ===
- Fu, X., Fu, M. Q., Ghauri, P. and Hou J. (2022) International collaboration and innovation: from a leading Chinese multinational enterprise. Journal of World Business, 57 (4). International collaboration and innovation: Evidence from a leading Chinese multinational enterprise
- Fu, X., Ghauri, P., Ogbonna, N. and Xing, X. (2022) Platform technology and entrepreneurship in the base of the pyramid. Technovation. Platform-based business model and entrepreneurs from Base of the Pyramid
- Ghauri, P, Fu, X. and Minayora, A. (2022) Digital technology-based entrepreneurial pursuit of the marginalised communities. Journal of International Management. Digital technology-based entrepreneurial pursuit of the marginalised communities
- Li, J., Van Assche, A. Fu, X., Li, Lee and G. Qian (2022) The Belt and Road Initiative and international business policy: A kaleidoscopic perspective. Journal of International Business Policy. The Belt and Road Initiative and international business policy: A kaleidoscopic perspective
- Fu, X., Buckley, P., Sanchez-Ancochea, D. and Hasan, I. (2021) The World has a Unique Opportunity, Journal of International Business Policy. The world has a unique opportunity: Accelerating technology transfer and vaccine production through partnerships
- Fu, X., Li, Y., Li, J. and H. Chesbrough (2021) When do latecomer firms undertake international open innovation: Evidence from China. Global Strategy Journal. 12 (1), 31–56. When do latecomer firms undertake international open innovation: Evidence from China
- Chen, J., Yin, X., Fu, X. and B. McKern (2021) Beyond catch-up: could China become the global innovation powerhouse? China's innovation progress and challenges from a holistic innovation perspective. Industry and Corporate Change, 30(4), 1037–1064.
- Lin, Y., Fu, M.X., and Fu, X. (2021) Varieties in state capitalism and corporate innovation: Evidence from an emerging economy, Journal of Corporate Finance, 67, 101919. Varieties in state capitalism and corporate innovation: Evidence from an emerging economy
- Fu, X., Emes, D., and Hou, J. (2021) Multinational enterprises and structural change in developing countries: A survey of literature. International Business Review. 30 (2), 101801. Multinational enterprises and structural transformation in emerging and developing countries: A survey of the literature
- Fu, M.X., Bao. Q., Xie, H., and Fu, X. (2021) Diffusion of industrial robots and inclusive growth: labour market evidence from cross-country data. Journal of Business Research, 122, 670–684. Diffusion of industrial robotics and inclusive growth: Labour market evidence from cross country data.
- Fu, X., Avenyo E. and Ghauri, P. (2021) Digital platform and development: A survey of literature, Innovation and Development, 11(2–3), 303–321. Digital platforms and development: a survey of the literature
- Fu, X., Zhang, J. and Wang, L. (2020) The impact of Covid-19 and post-pandemic recovery: China and the world economy, Journal of Chinese Economic and Business Studies, 18 (4), 311–319. Introduction to the special section: the impact of Covid-19 and post-pandemic recovery: China and the world economy
- Fu, X., Fu, M. X., Remero, C. and Pan, J. (2020) Exploring new opportunities through collaboration within and beyond sectoral systems of innovation: Evidence from China. Industry and Corporate Change, 30 (1), 233–249.
- Lema, R., Fu, X., & Rabellotti, R. (2020) Green windows of opportunity: latecomer development in the age of transformation toward sustainability, Industry and Corporate Change, 29 (5), 1193–1209. (published in 2021)
- Fu, X. and Ghauri, P. (2020), Trade in Intangibles and the Global Trade Imbalance. The World Economy.
- Fu, X.M., Bao, Q., Xie, H. and Fu, X. (2020) Diffusion of industrial robotics and inclusive growth: Labour market evidence from cross country data. Journal of Business Research.
- Corsi, S., Fu, X. and Kulzer-Sacilotto, C. (2020) Boundary spanning roles in cross-border university-industry collaboration: the case of Chinese multinational corporations. R&D management.
- Fu, X. (2020) Digital transformation of global value chains and sustainable post-pandemic recovery. Transnational Corporation, 27(2).
- Fu, X., Buckley, P.J. and Fu, X.M., (2020) The Growth Impact of Chinese Direct Investment on Host Developing Countries. International Business Review, 29(2), p. 101658.
- Fu, X., J Hou, M. Sanfilippo,(2016) ‘Highly skilled returnees and the internationalization of EMNEs: Firm level evidence from China’, International Business Review.
- Fu, Xiaolan (with Pietrobelli, and Soete) (2011), ‘The role of foreign technology and indigenous innovation in emerging economies: technological change and catch-up’, World Development, v39, no 7, 1203–1212.
- Fu, Xiaolan (and Gong) (2011), ‘Indigenous and foreign innovation efforts and drivers of technological upgrading’, World Development, v39, no 7, 1213–1225.
- Fu, Xiaoland (and Zhu) (2013) ‘Drivers of export upgrading’, World Development, v51, 221–233, doi:10.1016/j.worlddev.2013.05.017
- Fu, Xiaolan (2012) ‘Managerial knowledge spillovers from FDI through the diffusion of management practices’, Journal of Management Studies, v49, no 5, 970–999.
- Fu, Xiaolan (2012) ‘How does openness affect the importance of incentives for innovation?’ Research Policy, 41 (3), 512–523.
- Fu, Xiaolan (and Yang) (2009), ‘Exploring the cross-country gap in patenting: A Stochastic Frontier Approach’, Research Policy, vol38, no 7. 1203–1213.
- Fu, Xiaolan (with Zanello Mohnen and Ventresca) (2015), ‘Innovation in low income countries: a literature review’, Journal of Economic Survey. doi:10.1111/joes.12126
- Fu, Xiaolan (and Akter, S.) (2016) ‘The Impact of Mobile Phone Technology on Agricultural Extension Services Delivery: Evidence from India’, Journal of Development Studies.doi:10.1080/00220388.2016.1146700
- Fu, Xiaolan (and Li) (2016), ‘Collaboration with foreign universities for innovation: evidence from Chinese manufacturing firms’, International Journal of Technology Management, Vol. 70, Nos. 2/3,193-217.
- Fu, Xiaolan (2011) ‘Processing-trade, FDI and Exports of Indigenous Firms: Firm-level Evidence from High-technology Industries in China’, Oxford Bulletin of Economics and Statistics, v73, no 5. 792–817.
- Fu, Xiaolan (with Xiong, Li and Chesbrough) (2014), ‘Open Innovation as a Response to Constraints and Risks: Evidence from China’, Asian Economic Papers, 13 (3).
- Fu, Xiaolan (with Kaplinsky and Zhang) (2012), ‘The Impact of China on Low and Middle Income Countries’ Export Prices in Industrial-Country Markets’ World Development, v40 (8), 1483–96 (lead paper).
- Fu, Xiaolan (and Balasubramanyam) (2005), ‘Exports, Foreign Direct Investment and Employment: the Case of China’, World Economy, vol.28, no. 4, 607–625.
- Fu, Xiaolan (2004) ‘Limited Linkages from Growth Engines and Regional Disparities in China’, Journal of Comparative Economics, vol 32, no. 1, 148–164.
- Fu, Xiaolan (and Balasubramanyam) (2003), ‘Township and Village Enterprises in China’, Journal of Development Studies, Vol. 39, No. 4, 27–46.

== Current research ==
- MNEmerge project: MNEs and global development
- Valuation of early-stage technology
- Understanding innovation in low-income country
- Diffusion of innovation in low-incomes country
- The Role of Internationalisation on Technological Capability-Upgrading in Developing Countries
- The Inclusive Digital Model project
