= Chai Rong =

Later Zhou dynasty emperor from 954 to 959

Emperor Shizong of Later Zhou 後周世宗
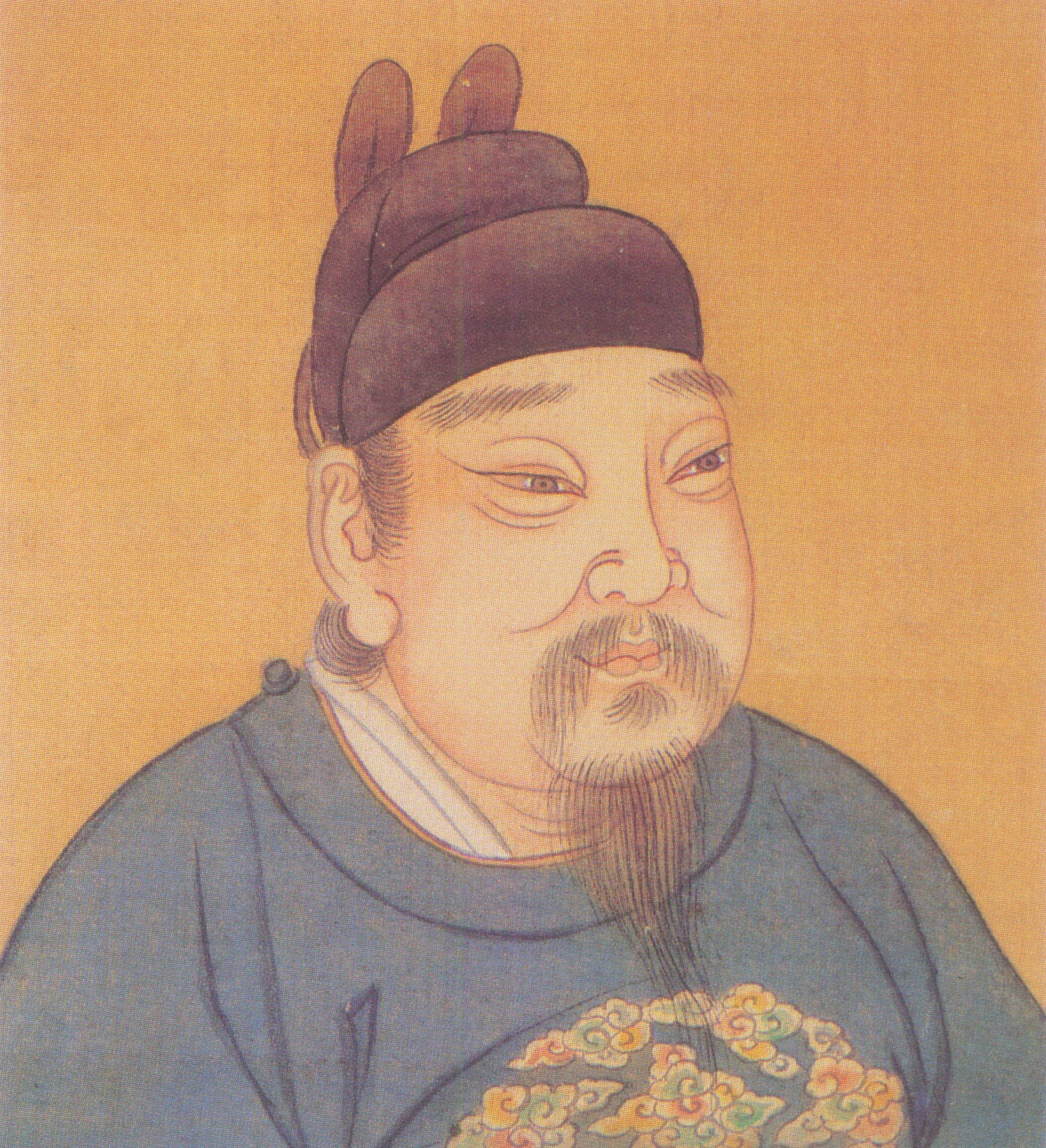

Emperor of the Later Zhou dynasty
- Reign: 26 February 954 – 27 July 959
- Predecessor: Guo Wei
- Successor: Guo Zongxun
- Born: 27 October 921; Xingzhou (modern Xingtai, Hebei, China)
- Died: 27 July 959 (aged 37); Kaifeng
- Burial: Qing Mausoleum (慶陵; in modern Xinzheng, Henan); 34°33′44.52″N 113°41′47.88″E
- Spouse: Lady Liu (劉氏) (dec. 950); Empress Fu the Elder (dec. 956); Empress Fu the Younger
- Issue: Guo Zongxun others
Names
- Surname: Guō (郭), originally Chái (柴) (Note: Zizhi Tongjian, ch. 289 indicates that he was called Guo Rong at least since 950. However, his original name Chai Rong was also well-known.); Given name: Róng (榮)
Era dates
- Xiǎndé (顯德), continued from Emperor Taizu; Year 1: 6 February 954 – 26 January 955; Year 2: 27 January 955 – 14 February 956; Year 3: 15 February 956 – 2 February 957; Year 4: 3 February 957 – 22 January 958; Year 5: 23 January 958 – 10 February 959; Year 6: 11 February 959 – 30 January 960
Posthumous name
- Emperor Ruìwǔ Xiàowén (睿武孝文皇帝)
Temple name
- Shìzōng (世宗)
- House: Guo (adoptive); Chai (original)
- Dynasty: Later Zhou
- Father: Guo Wei (adoptive); Chai Shouli (柴守禮) (biological)

Chai Rong
- Traditional Chinese: 柴榮
- Simplified Chinese: 柴荣
Transcriptions
Standard Mandarin
- Hanyu Pinyin: Chái Róng
- Wade–Giles: Ch'ai^{2} Jung^{2}
Yue: Cantonese
- Yale Romanization: Chaai^{4} Wing^{4}
- Jyutping: Caai^{4} Wing^{4}

Guo Rong (郭榮), also known as Chai Rong (Chinese: 柴榮) (27 October 921 – 27 July 959), with his temple name as the Emperor Shizong of Later Zhou, was the second emperor of the Later Zhou dynasty of China, during the Five Dynasties and Ten Kingdoms period. He succeeded his adoptive father Guo Wei (Emperor Taizu) and reigned from 954 until his death in 959.

Emperor Shizong is considered a highly successful emperor of the Five Dynasties period. He centralized military power by his reforms, and proved his military prowess by a series of victories against Northern Han, Later Shu, Southern Tang, and the Liao dynasty. Although his accomplishments were limited due to his premature death, they paved the way for the eventual unification of large parts of China proper by the Northern Song, founded by his trusted generals Zhao Kuangyin and Zhao Guangyi.

== Early life ==
Guo Rong was born in Xingzhou (邢州; modern Xingtai, Hebei). As a child he came to live with his aunt — a younger sister of his biological father Chai Shouli (柴守禮) — and her husband Guo Wei, an official in the Later Tang military. The Guos had no sons, so they adopted the quiet nephew as their own. The youngster grew up into a muscular young man skilled at mounted archery, while also possessing a basic understanding of Chinese classics, history, and the Huang-Lao philosophy. When he was an adult, he handled household affairs for Guo Wei, and often went out to do business, traveling back and forth between the Central China and the Jiangnan area.

== Career under Later Han ==
After the establishment of the Later Han in 947, the Guo family's condition improved dramatically. Guo Wei became the Commissioner of Military Affairs (樞密使) in 948, and his adopted son became the Left Commandant for Palace-gate Security (左堅門衛將軍). On 4 May 950, Guo was promoted to military governor of Tianxiong Command (天雄軍) and delegated to garrison at Weizhou (魏州; modern Linzhang County, Hebei) at the Later Han-Liao dynasty border to prevent a possible Liao incursion. Ten days later, his adopted son was appointed Tianxiong Command's Chief Director of Military Headquarters (牙內都指揮使) to follow him in Weizhou. Guo Rong was also given a nominal post of prefect of Guizhou (貴州). (Note: Guizhou (貴州; modern Guigang, Guangxi) was then under Southern Han's and not Later Han's direct control.)

In 950, the Later Han emperor Liu Chengyou unexpectedly killed the entire family of Guo Wei as a plot to liquidate the most powerful ministers in his nation. Guo Wei decided to rebel. As Guo Rong's wife Lady Liu (劉氏) and children including 3 young sons also remained in the capital Bianzhou (汴州; today's Kaifeng, Henan), they were all slaughtered as well. Guo Wei asked Guo Rong to stay behind at the frontier as he led his main army southbound towards Bianzhou.

== Career under Emperor Taizu of Later Zhou ==
In a few months, Liu Chengyou was killed, Later Han was terminated, as Guo Wei founded the Later Zhou. Guo Rong became the military governor of Zhenning Command (鎮寧軍) and went to Chanzhou (澶州; today's Qingfeng County, Henan). At Chanzhou, he quickly eradicated militarized outlaws in the region and promoted literati to enforce laws more effectively, winning the support of the people. He also initiated projects to tear down dilapidated street walls and build new public office buildings and residential housings.

Chancellor Wang Jun, the most powerful minister, did not see eye-to-eye with Guo Rong on some issues and prevented him from visiting the capital on more than one occasion. In 952, Guo Rong requested permission to lead an army to quell a rebellion, but Wang Jun vetoed it for fear that Guo Rong would hold too much military power. At the end, Guo Wei had to personally lead the troops as an emperor. It was not until Wang's banishment in early 953 that Guo Rong finally got a chance to come back to the capital, when in April 953 he was named Prince of Jin (晉王). By this time he was again married, to a Lady Fu, a widowed daughter of general Fu Yanqing. His son Guo Zongxun was born in late 953 in Chanzhou.

== Emperor of Later Zhou ==
Guo Rong (posthumously known as Shizong of Later Zhou) became emperor in 954 upon his adoptive father's death. Like his father, he was considered an able ruler. He continued reforms introduced by his father. More importantly, he began putting pressure on the Northern Han and even the Liao dynasty, though nothing substantial came of it. More success was met in the south as some minor successes were made against the Southern Tang and Later Shu, paving the way to eventual unification by the Song dynasty.

=== Campaign against Liu Chong ===
One month after Guo Rong took the throne, Liu Chong, Emperor of Northern Han, colluded with Liao dynasty to launch an assault on Later Zhou. Against the advice of Minister Feng Dao, Guo Rong decided to lead the army to fight against the incursion. When Guo Rong engaged Liu Chong at Gao Ping (in modern Jincheng, Shanxi), two of his general Fan Aineng, He Hui fled from battlefield along with their troops. At this critical moment, Guo Rong risked his life to break through the defense and crushed Liu's forces. After this campaign, Guo Rong consolidated his power.

He suffered an early death at the age of 38 when he died from illness while out on the field in 959. He left behind him a six-year-old heir to succeed him. This led to the fall of the dynasty and the rise of the Song dynasty, which eventually succeeded in reunifying most of China proper.

== Family ==
=== Parents ===
- Adoptive father: Emperor Taizu of Later Zhou, Guo Wei (世宗睿武孝文皇帝 郭威)
- Adoptive mother (biological aunt): Empress Shengmu, of the Chai clan (聖穆皇后 柴氏)
- Biological father: Chai Shouli (柴守禮)

=== Consorts and issue ===
- Empress Zhenhui, of the Liu clan (貞惠皇后 劉氏; d. 951)
- Empress Xuanyi, of the Fu clan (宣懿符皇后; 931 – 29 August 956), daughter of Fu Yanqing (符彥卿)
- Empress Xiaofu, of the Fu clan (小符皇后; 933－993), daughter of Fu Yanqing (符彥卿)
- Unknown:
  - Guo Zongyi (郭宗誼; d. 24 December 950), 1st son
  - Guo Cheng (郭誠; d.24 December 950), 2nd son
  - Guo Xian, Prince of Han (韓王 郭諴; d. 24 December 950), 3rd son
  - Emperor Gong, Guo Zongxun (梁王 郭宗訓; 14 September 953 – 6 April 1973), 4th son
  - Guo Xirang (郭熙讓), 5th son
  - Guo Xijing (郭熙謹), 6th son
  - Guo Xihui (郭熙誨), 7th son

== Veneration as Wealth God ==
In some traditions of Chinese folk religion, Guo Rong is venerated as a Wealth God in the "Big Five Roads" (大五路財神; dà wǔ lù cáishén) grouping, in which he is identified as the Southern Road Wealth God (南路財神; nánlù cáishén). The grouping pairs Guo Rong (south) with Bi Gan (east), Guan Yu (west), Wang Hai (centre), and Zhao Gongming (north). The folk-religion identification appears in popular sources rather than in classical Taoist liturgy, and is one of several regional wealth-god groupings.

== In modern TV series ==
Guo Rong and his family members are called after their actual historical names with surname Guo in TV series Swords Into Plowshares.

== Notes ==
Chai Rong House of Chai (954–960) Born: 921 Died: 959
Regnal titles
Preceded by Emperor Taizu of Later Zhou	Emperor of the Later Zhou; 954–959	Succeeded by The Emperor Gongdi
