= Emperor Ai of Han =

Emperor of Han China from 7 BC to 1 BC

Emperor Ai of Han 漢哀帝
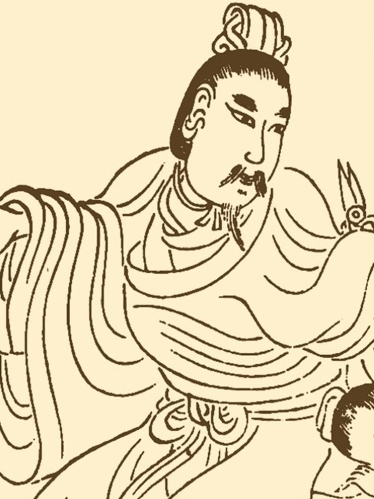
- Depiction by Chen Hongshou, 1651

Emperor of the Han dynasty
- Reign: 7 May 7 BC – 15 August 1 BC
- Predecessor: Emperor Cheng
- Successor: Emperor Ping
- Born: 25 BC; Dingtao Principality, Han Empire
- Died: 15 August 1 BC (aged 24); Chang'an, Han Empire
- Burial: Yi Mausoleum (義陵)
- Spouse: Empress Xiao'ai (consort); Dong Xian (lover)
Names
- Family name: Liu (劉 liú); Given name: Xin (欣, xīn)
Era dates
- Jìanpíng 建平 (6–3 BC); Yúanshòu 元壽 (2–1 BCE)
Posthumous name
- Emperor Xiao'ai (孝哀皇帝) "filial and lamentable"
- House: Liu
- Dynasty: Han (Western Han)
- Father: Liu Kang
- Mother: Lady Ding

Emperor Ai of Han, personal name Liu Xin (劉欣; 25 BC – 15 August 1 BC), was the 13th emperor of China's Han dynasty. He ascended the throne when he was 20, having been made heir by his childless uncle Emperor Cheng, and he reigned from 7 to 1 BC.

The people and the officials were initially excited about his ascension, as he was viewed by them (as well as Emperor Cheng) to be intelligent, articulate, and capable. However, under Emperor Ai, corruption became even more prevalent and heavy taxes were levied on the people. Furthermore, Emperor Ai was highly controlled by his grandmother Consort Fu (consort of his grandfather and his predecessor's father Emperor Yuan), who demanded the title of Grand Empress Dowager—even though she had never been an empress previously and therefore did not properly hold that title, and this led to the unprecedented and unrepeated situation of four women possessing empress dowager titles at the same time—Empress Wang Zhengjun (Emperor Cheng's mother and Emperor Yuan's wife), Empress Zhao Feiyan (Emperor Cheng's wife), Consort Fu, and Consort Ding (Emperor Ai's mother). Consort Fu's control of the political scene extended until her death in February 2 BC.

During Emperor Ai's reign, he also stripped the Wang clan (Empress Wang's clan), which had been powerful during Emperor Cheng's reign, of much of their power, and substituted members of the Fu and Ding clans in their stead (which, ironically, caused the people, who were not enamored with the Wangs initially, to long for their return to power, as they associated the departure of the Wangs from power with Emperor Ai's incompetence in administration).

In an unpopular act, Emperor Ai had his prime minister Wang Jia (王嘉, unrelated to the Wang clan mentioned above) put to death for criticizing him, an act that made him appear tyrannical. Emperor Ai's shortcomings quickly led to the demoralization of the people towards the government and the acquisition of power by Wang Mang, in a backlash, after Ai died in 1 BC.

Many regarded Emperor Ai as the most effusive homosexual emperor of the Han dynasty, although the Han Dynasty included many emperors that had male lovers. Traditional historians characterized the relationship between Emperor Ai and Dong Xian as one between homosexual lovers and referred to their relationship as "the passion of the cut sleeve" (斷袖之癖) after a story that one afternoon after falling asleep for a nap on the same bed, Emperor Ai cut off his sleeve rather than disturb the sleeping Dong Xian when he had to get out of bed. During Emperor Ai's reign, officials became aware of the promises tied to his favoritism, beginning to dress in a highly ornate fashion. Ironically, Dong was noted for his relative simplicity and given progressively higher and higher posts as part of the relationship, eventually becoming the supreme commander of the armed forces by the time of Emperor Ai's death. Dong was afterward forced to die by suicide.

Emperor Ai also became an influential figure in a Chinese historical anthology called Duanxiupian (断袖篇) focusing on homosexuality in ancient China. Additionally, Emperor Ai is an important figure in Chinese pop culture, especially in online Dan Mei pieces. Online literature referring to him have been emerging on websites such as Jinjiang Literature City.

== Family background and early life as the Prince of Dingtao ==
Emperor Ai was born to Liu Kang (劉康), Prince of Dingtao, a brother of then-reigning Emperor Cheng and son of Emperor Yuan, and his concubine Consort Ding, in 25 BC, presumably at Prince Kang's principality (roughly modern Heze, Shandong). From birth, he was raised by his paternal grandmother, the domineering Consort Fu, and not by his mother. Prince Kang died in September or October 23 BC, and the two-year-old Prince Xin became the Prince of Dingtao.

In 9 BC, the then-18-year-old Prince Xin impressed his uncle Emperor Cheng when on an official visit to the capital Chang'an, when he brought three key officials of his principality—his teacher, his prime minister, and the commander of his capital's defense forces—to accompany him and cited the proper legal regulations that, in his opinion, required and allowed him to bring them with him (even though it was customary that princes would bring only their teachers). He also showed clear understanding of the Confucian classic Shi Jing, further impressing Emperor Cheng. At that time, the son-less Emperor Cheng was beginning to consider making either his younger brother Liu Xing, Prince of Zhongshan (中山王劉興) or his nephew Prince Xin his heir. Emperor Cheng became convinced that Prince Xin was more capable, and at the same time, Prince Xin's grandmother Consort Fu was endearing herself to Emperor Cheng's wife Empress Zhao Feiyan, her sister and Emperor Cheng's favorite Consort Zhao Hede, and Emperor Cheng's uncle Wang Gen with lavish gifts, and so the Zhaos and Wang Gen both praised Prince Xin as well. Emperor Cheng therefore seriously considered making Prince Xin his heir.

In 8 BC, Emperor Cheng summoned several key officials to discuss with him who would be the more proper heir. The majority, perhaps seeing that Emperor Cheng was leaning toward Prince Xin, recommended him, citing the general rule of succession that when one lacked an heir, he should adopt a brother's child to be his own son and heir; one official recommended Prince Xing under the rationale that he was closer in bloodline with the emperor. Emperor Cheng, whose mind was fairly made up, created him Crown Prince Xin. In an act praised one as showing humility, Prince Xin declined the honor of living at the crown prince's palace, stating that he was only at the capital to serve Emperor Cheng until Emperor Cheng would produce an heir and that he should stay at the Dingtao mission in the capital.

== As crown prince ==
Whether Emperor Cheng was formally adopting Prince Xin would quickly become a major controversy. Emperor Cheng viewed his recognition of Prince Xin as crown prince as formal adoption, and he believed that Prince Xin was now his son, no longer Prince Kang's. When he created a cousin to be the new Prince of Dingtao to serve as Prince Kang's heir in c.December 8 BC, Prince Xin, grateful that his father would continue to be worshipped as an ancestor, submitted a formal note of thanksgiving—at which Emperor Cheng was highly offended, believing that Prince Xin should not be grateful any more for whatever is done for his birth father.

Emperor Cheng's desire to have Prince Xin act as only his son extended to the arena of Prince Xin's relationship with his grandmother Consort Fu and his mother Consort Ding. Emperor Cheng decreed that Consort Fu (now princess dowager of Dingtao) and Consort Ding be required to remain in Dingtao and not be allowed to come to Chang'an to visit Prince Xin. Some time later, Emperor Cheng's mother Empress Dowager Wang, not wanting to continue these harsh regulations, decreed that Princess Dowager Fu be allowed to see Prince Xin, under the rationale that she, having raised him, was merely in the role of a wet nurse. Consort Ding, however, would continue to not be allowed to see Prince Xin.

Emperor Cheng died suddenly in April 7 BC, apparently from a stroke (although historians also report the possibility of an overdose of aphrodisiacs given to him by Consort Zhao Hede). Crown Prince Xin ascended the throne as Emperor Ai. Empress Dowager Wang, as his step-grandmother (and "legal" grandmother) became grand empress dowager, and Empress Zhao became empress dowager. He created Consort Fu, the daughter of his grandmother Princess Dowager Fu's cousin Fu Yan (傅晏), empress.

== As emperor ==
=== Early reign—optimism ===
Emperor Ai, aged 20 at his ascension, quickly ended Emperor Cheng's practice of delegating imperial authorities to his uncles and cousins of the Wang clan and appeared diligent in his rule. He also reduced national expenditure greatly. Both the officials and the people thought that after the reigns of the indecisive Emperor Yuan and the impulsive and lavish spending Emperor Cheng, there would finally be a capable emperor.

In addition, Emperor Ai ordered Liu Xin to compile texts of the Seven Arts (Qi Lue), a crucial historical bibliographical work, often referred to as the first systemic compiled text of the genre in Chinese history.

In 7 BC, under Emperor Ai's auspices, a major proposal to reduce involuntary servitude was made by several officials—princes would be limited to 200 servants (it was as many as they like before), marquesses and princesses to 100 servants (it was 200 before), and other nobility and commoners to 30 servants (it was 100 before, and that servants would be set free after a service of three years) . However, after the proposal was leaked, many slave owners pushed to have the proposal tabled, and Emperor Ai only issued a limited version of the proposal—freeing servants over age 50.

=== Optimism shattered ===
The issue of the roles of Princess Dowager Fu and Consort Ding (and what honor, if any, to posthumously bestow on Emperor Ai's biological father Prince Kang), however, would quickly again erupt into a major controversy. Initially, Grand Empress Dowager Wang decreed that Princess Dowager Fu and Consort Ding see him periodically, every 10 days. However, Princess Dowager Fu quickly began to visit her grandson everyday, and she insisted that two things be done: that she receive an empress dowager title, and that her relatives be granted titles, like the Wangs. Grand Empress Dowager Wang, sympathetic of the bind that Emperor Ai was in, first granted Prince Kang the unusual title of "Emperor Gong of Dingtao" (定陶共皇) and then, under the rationale of that title, granted Princess Dowager Fu the title "Empress Dowager Gong of Dingtao" (定陶共皇太后) and Consort Ding the title "Empress Gong of Dingtao" (定陶共皇后). Several members of the Fu and Ding clans were created marquesses. Grand Empress Dowager Wang also ordered her paternal nephew Wang Mang, the commander of the armed forces, to resign and transfer power to the Fus and the Dings. Emperor Ai declined and begged Wang Mang to stay in his administration.

Several months later, however, Wang Mang would come into direct confrontation with now-Empress Dowager Fu. At a major imperial banquet, the official in charge of seating placed Empress Dowager Fu's seat next to Grand Empress Dowager Wang's. When Wang Mang saw this, he rebuked the official and ordered that Empress Dowager Fu's seat be moved to the side, which drew great ire from Empress Dowager Fu, who refused to attend the banquet. To soothe her anger, Wang Mang resigned, and Emperor Ai approved his resignation. After Wang Mang's resignation, the Wangs gradually and inexorably began to lose their power. At Empress Dowager Fu's behest, the Fus and the Dings were installed in their place.

Empress Dowager Fu was not satisfied with what she saw was her inferior title (as only empress dowager, not grand empress dowager, and with the qualifier "of Dingtao"). Several key officials who opposed her move were reduced to commoner status without any other fault—including the prime minister Kong Guang (孔光) and the prime inspector Shi Dan (師丹)—two of the top three officials of the administration. The third one, Empress Dowager Fu's cousin Fu Xi (傅喜), who also opposed Empress Dowager Fu's actions notwithstanding his relationship with her, was removed from his position and sent back to his march.

In 6 BCE, Empress Dowager Fu would further display her power and at the same time cause the people to be even more disappointed in Emperor Ai. Emperor Ai's cousin Liu Jizi (劉箕子), the Prince of Zhongshan (Prince Xing's son), had a congenital heart disorder, and his grandmother Feng Yuan, the princess dowager, cared for his treatment and often worshipped gods to pray for his healing. Emperor Ai, upon hearing his cousin's illness, sent imperial physicians along with his attendant Zhang You (張由) to go to Zhongshan (roughly modern Baoding, Hebei) to treat Prince Jizi. Zhang, however, was himself afflicted with a psychiatric condition (probably bipolar disorder), and when he got to Zhongshan, he suddenly, in a rage, left there and returned to Chang'an. Once he did and was ordered to explain his conduct, he made up a false reason—that he had discovered that Princess Dowager Feng was using witchcraft to curse Emperor Ai and Empress Dowager Fu. Empress Dowager Fu and Princess Dowager Feng were romantic rivals when they were both consorts to Emperor Yuan, and Empress Dowager Fu decided to use this opportunity to strike at Princess Dowager Feng. She sent a loyal eunuch, Shi Li (史立), to serve as investigator, and Shi tortured a good number of Princess Dowager Feng's relations (including her sister Feng Xi (馮習) and her sister-in-law Junzhi (君之)), some to death, but still could not build a solid case against Princess Dowager Feng. Shi Li decided to show Princess Dowager Feng who was actually behind the investigation, by referring to an incident in which then-Consort Feng defended Emperor Yuan against a bear which had broken loose. Princess Dowager Feng, realizing that Empress Dowager Fu was behind the investigation, went back to her palace and died by suicide. In total, 17 members of the Feng clan died as a result of the investigations. This was immediately viewed as a political case, and officials and the people all became disappointed in Emperor Ai.

In 5 BC, Empress Dowager Fu would finally get what she wanted. Emperor Ai removed the qualification "of Dingtao" from his father's posthumous title (thus making him simply "Emperor Gong"), and then gave his grandmother a variation of the grand empress dowager title (ditaitaihou (帝太太后), compared to Grand Empress Dowager Wang's title taihuangtaihou (太皇太后)) and his mother a variation of the empress dowager title (ditaihou (帝太后), compared to Empress Dowager Zhao's title huangtaihou (皇太后)), and there were therefore now four official empresses dowager in the capital, each with a full budget. That year, the new Empress Dowager Ding died on 9 July.

During these years, other than the palatial infighting, what plagued Emperor Ai's administration (not unlike how it plagued his uncle Emperor Cheng's administration) was the general situation where good proposals would be made to Emperor Ai, and then he would approve of them personally but not take any actual actions on them. Further, he was harsh in his punishments of officials who disagreed with him—including, but not limited to, the issue of his grandmother and mother's titles. He would often backtrack in these punishments as well after some time, which also made him appear indecisive. He would also quickly promote officials that he saw as capable and honest and then, as soon as that capability or honesty offended him in some way, demote them. His temper might have been related to the fact that he was also constantly ill, although the nature of the illness is not known.

=== The rise of Dong Xian ===
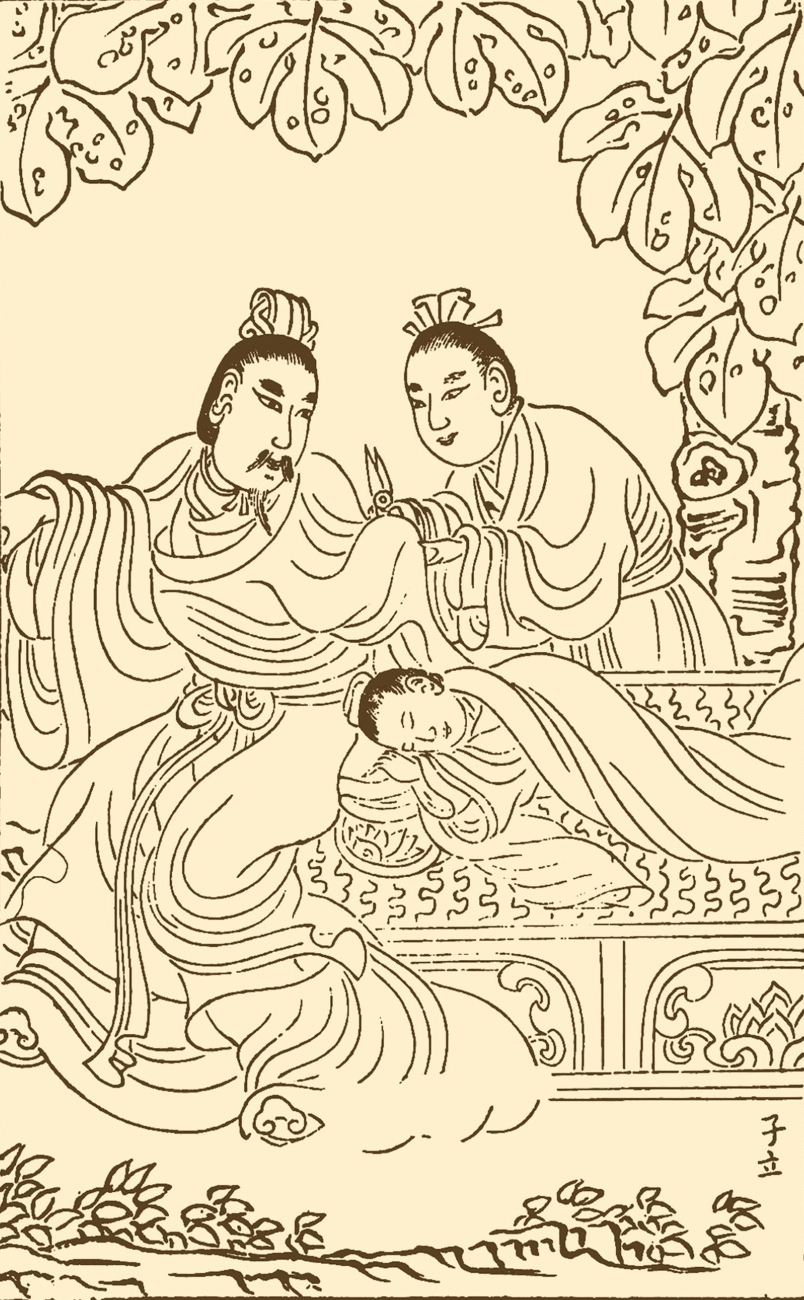
Emperor Ai cuts off his sleeve to not awaken Dong Xian

Circa 4 BC, Emperor Ai began to favor the minor official Dong Xian, and historians largely believe that they had a homosexual relationship. Both men were married, but that would not have been seen as conflicting with a homosexual love affair, as it was typical for Chinese men of the time to have multiple sexual relationships. Ai came from a long line of emperors, all married of course, with male companions listed in their official histories.

Ai bestowed honors on Dong at a rate which alarmed the court. Dong and his wife moved into the palace, and Dong's sister became an imperial consort. Dong's father was made an acting marquess (關內侯). Emperor Ai also ordered that a residence as luxurious as an imperial palace be built for Dong. All who opposed these honors for Dong were severely punished.

In 3 BC, against opposition by his prime minister Wang Jia (王嘉), Emperor Ai created Dong the Marquess of Gao'an. The following year, the prime minister submitted a report to Emperor Ai, in which he urged that the honors bestowed on Dong be curbed. This report was carefully worded to appear to be looking out for Dong. It warned that Dong might suffer the same fate of Emperor Wen's favorite lover Deng Tong (鄧通), who starved to death after his assets were confiscated by Emperor Wen's heir, or of Emperor Wu's favorite Han Yan (韓嫣), who was executed by Empress Dowager Wang after being accused of improperly assuming imperial style.

Later in 2 BC, when Wang Jia opposed the expansion of Dong's march, Emperor Ai had him accused falsely of crimes and forced him to die by suicide through fasting. On January 1 BC, Dong was made the commander of the armed forces—at age 22 (by East Asian reckoning) —and effectively the most powerful official in the administration. Several members of the Dong clan became important court officials as well, displacing the Fus and the Dings after Grand Empress Dowager Fu died in February 2 BC.

== Death ==
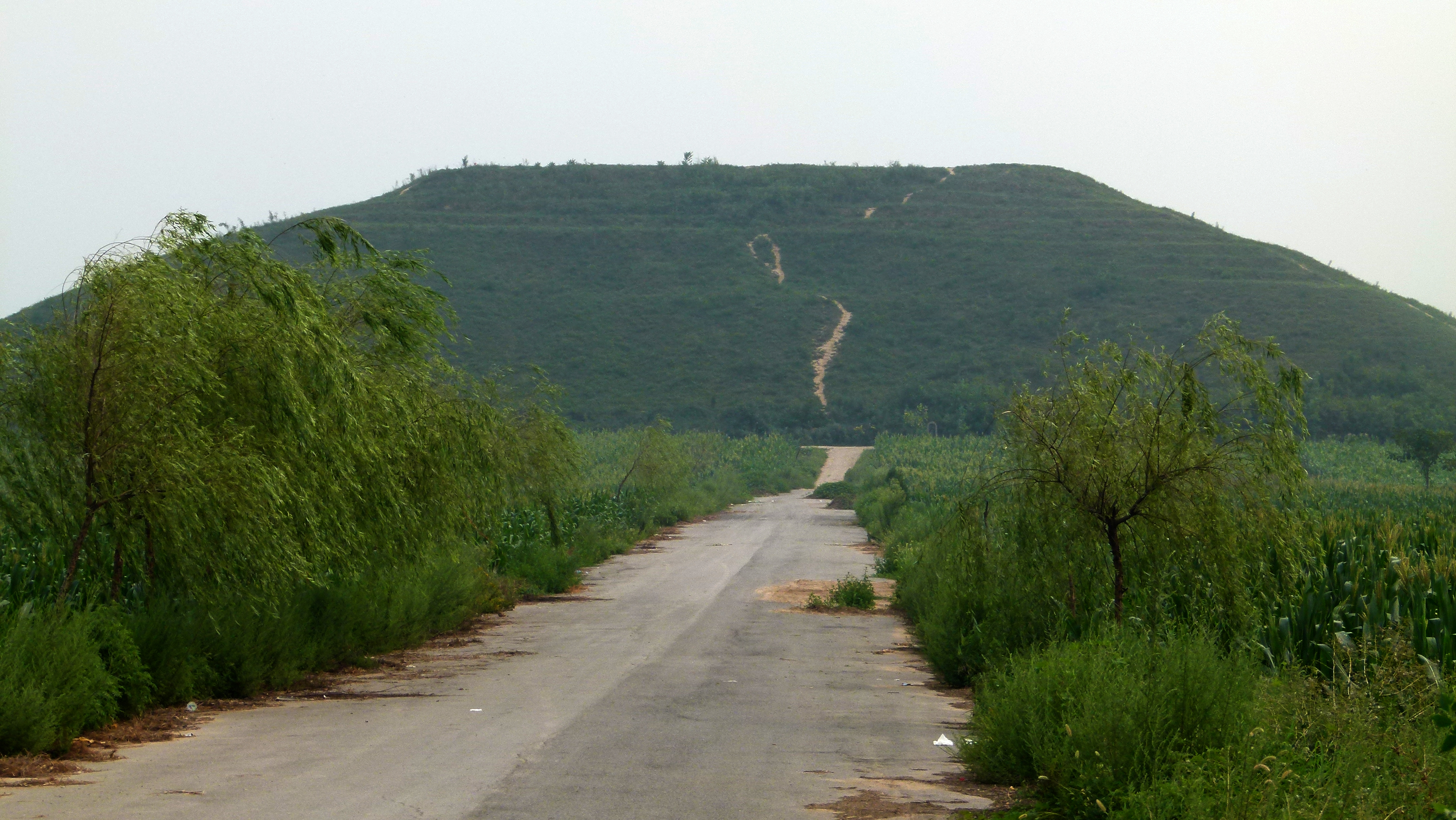
Yiling (義陵), the tomb of Emperor Ai, in Xianyang, Shaanxi province

Emperor Ai died in August 1 BC. It is not clear what the exact cause of death was, but he appeared to succumb to illnesses from which he had always suffered. On his deathbed, Ai ordered that his throne be passed on to Dong Xian, but this was ignored by imperial counselors.

The Grand Empress Dowager acted quickly to seize his seal and to take power back from Dong Xian, reinstating Wang Mang as the regent. Dong Xian and his wife were forced to die by suicide. Emperor Ai would officially be succeeded by his cousin, Prince Jizi, as Emperor Ping, but this was merely a pretext for Wang Mang to seize the throne nine years later. Emperor Ai's abuse of power, first influenced by his grandmother and then by his love for Dong, caused the people and the officials to yearn for the return of the Wangs.

== Era names ==
- Jianping (建平) 6 BC – 3 BC
- Yuanshou (元壽) 2 BC – 1 BC

== Consorts ==
- Empress Xiao'ai, of the Fu clan (孝哀皇后 傅氏), second cousin once removed, personal name Daijun (黛君)
- Zhaoyi of the Dong clan, sister of Dong Xian

== In popular culture ==
- One traditional story about Emperor Ai and Dong Xian, duàn xìu zhi pi (斷袖之癖, literally, "passion of the cut sleeve"), gave rise to the euphemism duàn xìu 断袖 (cut sleeve), which referred to men who have sex with men. Stories of later relationships between men were often called Records of the Cut Sleeve, although today the euphemism is in rare use.
- Emperor Ai is a major figure in Duanxiupian (断袖篇), a historical anthology focusing on homosexuality in ancient China.
- The relationship between Emperor Ai and Dong Xian features in the 2024 novel The Emperor and the Endless Palace, by Justinian Huang.
- Emperor Ai figures in many online Danmei pieces on sites like Jinjiang Literature City.

== See also ==
1. Family tree of the Han dynasty

Emperor Ai of Han House of Liu Born: 27 BCE Died: 1 BCE
Regnal titles
Preceded by Emperor Cheng of Han	Emperor of China; Western Han; 7–1 BCE	Succeeded by Emperor Ping of Han
