= Fu Yaoyu =

Fu Yaoyu (傅堯俞; courtesy name: Qinzhi 欽之) (1024–1091) was a Chinese government official of the Song dynasty. Because of his vigorous opposition to the reforms of Wang Anshi, he was banished to serve as a Superintendent of Pastures. After Fu Yaoyu became a Xuzhou magistrate, he found that some of the provisions for the army had been appropriated by his predecessor. Though he tried to make up for the loss, he was dismissed from office. Having offered neither an explanation or an excuse, Shao Yong, the Song dynasty philosopher, praised Fu Yaoyu: "O Qinzhi! You are clear and yet not shining, upright and yet not extreme, and courageous and yet courteous! What an achievement you made!" At his death, the empress said, "Truly he was a perfect man, as it were of gold or jade!"
