= Fu Honglie =

Fu Honglie (Chinese: 傅弘烈; Wade–Giles: Fu Hung-lieh) (died AD 1680) was a native of Jiangxi, who gave his allegiance to the Manchus in 1657 and was employed as a Prefect.

For reporting the treasonable designs of Wu Sangui in 1688, he was condemned to death, but the sentence was commuted to banishment to Guangxi. Here he was when Wu revolted, and the latter at once sent to seize him. He tried to drown himself, but was rescued and sent to the revolted general of Guangxi, Sun Yanling, who was however won over by his admonitions, joined with the entreaties of his wife, and sent him to Nanning in order to get aid from Cochin-china. To save himself from suspicion, Fu accepted a general's commission from the rebels, and at the same time entered into a secret league with Shang Zhixin against them. In 1677, he opened communications with the Imperial generals in Hunan and Guangdong; and having enlisted many of the frontier tribes, fought his way to Shaozhou and so joined hands with them, to learn that he was appointed Governor of Guangxi. All his family had been sent as hostages to Wu Sangui, and were slain on his taking the Imperialist side; and this so enraged him that he laid down his Governorship and devoted himself entirely to the war. His efforts were hampered by Shang Kexi, who would not lend a gun nor a horse and would not move a man. Yet he was on the whole successful, even though working with raw levies, and in 1680 had got to the border of Guizhou. Then the stupidity of a subordinate, who without his knowledge marched a force after him as he went to an interview with an ex-rebel leader, excited the latter's suspicion, and he was seized and sent to Guiyang. Here the grandson and successor of Wu Sangui, Wu Shifan (吳世璠), after vain endeavors to shake his loyalty, put him to death.

His remains, recovered on the recapture of Guiyang at the end of 1680, received a public funeral; and the Emperor published his secret memorials revealing the treasonable designs of Shang Zhixin, memorials which this time were acted upon without undue delay. Fu was canonised and included in the Temple of Patriots.
