= Fu Nai =

Chinese politician

Fu Nai (Chinese: 傅鼐; 1758 - 8 August 1811), courtesy name Chong'an (重庵), was a Qing dynasty statesman born during the reign of the Qianlong Emperor. He made himself famous by his skillful treatment of the aborigines of Hunan. He first conquered and disarmed them, and then set to work to teach them to cultivate the arts of peace. He was particularly successful as a military leader, though himself actually a civilian. In 1809 he rose to be Judge in Hunan, and was ordered, by special request of the aborigines, to visit their territory once a year.

== See also ==
- Miao Rebellion 1795-1806
