= Fu Youyi =

Chinese chancellor of the Tang dynasty (?–691)

Fu Youyi (傅遊藝) (died August 24, 691), known as Wu Youyi (武遊藝) during the reign of Wu Zetian, was an official of the Chinese Tang dynasty and Wu Zetian's Zhou dynasty, serving as a chancellor briefly after she took the throne in 690. He was known for being the first official to publicly petition her to take the throne and establish her own dynasty and was awarded for his public stance by being promoted within a year from a low-level official to the upper echelon of the imperial administration. In 691, however, he was accused of having even greater ambitions and arrested; he committed suicide.

It is not known when Fu Youyi was born, but it is known that he was from Ji County (汲縣, in modern Xinxiang, Henan). As of 690, when Wu Zetian was serving as empress dowager and regent over her son Emperor Ruizong, he was serving as an assistant imperial censor (侍御史), when he led a group of some 900 people from the Guanzhong region to publicly petition, outside the palace, the abolition of the Tang dynasty and the establishment of a new Zhou dynasty with her as "emperor." Empress Dowager Wu initially publicly declined but promoted him. As a result, waves of petitions requesting the same thing came, and eventually Emperor Ruizong also submitted such a petition. Empress Dowager Wu eventually accepted and took the throne as emperor, establishing Zhou and interrupting Tang. After she took the throne, she made Fu Luantai Shilang (鸞臺侍郎), the deputy head of the examination bureau of government (鸞臺, Luantai). She also gave him the designation Tong Fengge Luantai Pingzhangshi (同鳳閣鸞臺平章事), making him a chancellor de facto. She further bestowed him the imperial family name of Wu. As, within the same year, he had gone through the four colors of official uniforms—blue, green, red, and purple, from the lowest grade to nearly the highest grade, he was referred to semi-derogatorily as "the seasonal official."

In 691, Fu was given the additional honorific title of Yinqing Guanglu Daifu (銀青光祿大夫); at that time, his brother Fu Shentong (傅神童) served as the minister of public works. A month later, he was made the deputy minister of ceremonies and was no longer chancellor. Meanwhile, around the same time, Fu Youyi had a dream in which he sat in one of halls in the imperial palace, Danlu Hall (湛露殿). He told this dream to a close associate, an action that was considered inappropriate as it showed ambition to be emperor. The associate secretly reported this to Wu Zetian. She had him arrested, and he committed suicide while in prison.

== Notes and references ==
- Old Book of Tang, vol. 186, part 1.
- Zizhi Tongjian, vol. 204.
