= Elder Empress Fu =

Empress Fu
- Empress Xuanyi of (Later) Zhou

Empress consort of Later Zhou
- Tenure: 23 May 954 – 29 August 956
- Successor: Empress Fu (sister)
- Born: 931
- Died: 29 August 956; Bianzhou, Later Zhou (today's Kaifeng, Henan)
- Burial: in today's Xinzheng, Henan 34°33′42.96″N 113°41′52.98″E
- Spouse: Li Chongxun (李崇訓) (dec. 949); Chai Rong
Names
- Surname: Fú (符); Given name: unknown
Posthumous name
- Empress Xuānyì (宣懿皇后)
- Father: Fu Yanqing

Empress Fu (符皇后; given name unknown) (c. 931 – 29 August 956), posthumously Empress Xuanyi (宣懿皇后) was an empress consort of the Chinese Later Zhou dynasty during the Five Dynasties and Ten Kingdoms period. She was invested the empress in 954 when her husband Guo Rong (Chai Rong) became the second Later Zhou emperor. Three years after her death, Guo Rong married her younger sister when he fell critically ill.

Originally the wife of Li Chongxun (李崇訓), she was widowed in 949 following a narrow escape from death. After Chai was also widowed in 950, they married through the arrangement of Chai's adoptive father and Later Zhou's founding emperor Guo Wei.

== First marriage to Li Chongxun ==
When Lady Fu was a teenager, her father Fu Yanqing was a military governor for the Later Han. He arranged for her to marry fellow military governor Li Shouzhen's son Li Chongxun (李崇訓). In 948, Li Shouzhen and Li Chongxun rebelled against the Later Han government, and another military governor, Guo Wei, was tasked to suppress the mutiny. After months of battles, in 949 Li Shouzhen was defeated and committed suicide. Following suit, Li Chongxun first killed his siblings, but as he prepared to kill his wife, she hid under the curtains of her bedroom. Unable to find her in a hurry, Li Chongxun killed himself.

When Guo Wei's soldiers stormed into the house, they saw a young girl (Lady Fu was only 18) calmly sitting in the reception hall. She declared, "The gentleman Guo Wei is an old acquaintance of my father's. Your sort would be wise not to violate me!" It proved to be effective as no Later Han soldier dared to approach her. Later, Guo personally assured her that he would not harm her and would return her to her family safely. The young girl was so grateful that from then on she regarded the senior commander as her godfather.

== Second marriage to Chai Rong ==
In 951, Guo Wei and his nephew-in-law Chai Rong were station at Weizhou (魏州; today's Linzhang County, Hebei) when the Later Han emperor Liu Chengyou killed their entire families left behind in the capital Bianzhou (汴州; today's Kaifeng, Henan). Guo led his troops to attack the capital, and after the death of Liu Chengyou, declared himself the emperor of the new Later Zhou.

Having lost his wife and children to the senseless killing, Chai Rong was looking for another mate. He had been quite impressed by Lady Fu's story, presumably having also met her due to their close associations with Guo Wei. Lady Fu was also looking for a second marriage. Her mother had advised her to shave her head and become a nun following her miraculous escape from death, but she refused, stating, "Why should I deform my own body and hair?" At the arrangement of Guo, she married Chai, 10 years her senior.

== Notes and references ==
=== Sources ===
- (in Chinese) Xue Juzheng; et al., eds. (974). Wudai Shi (五代史) [History of the Five Dynasties].
- (in Chinese) Ouyang Xiu (1073). Wudai Shiji (五代史記) [Historical Records of the Five Dynasties].
- (in Chinese) Sima Guang (1086). Zizhi Tongjian (資治通鑑) [Comprehensive Mirror for Aid in Government].

Chinese royalty
Preceded by Empress Li of Later Han	Empress of China (Central); 954–956	Succeeded by Empress Dowager Fu (Later Zhou)
