= Fu Daqing =

Fu Daqing (traditional Chinese: 付大慶; simplified Chinese: 傅大庆; pinyin: Fù Dàqìng), alias Fu Dajing (traditional Chinese: 符大經; simplified Chinese: 符大经; pinyin: Fú Dàjīng), was a Chinese Communist propagandist, translator and organiser who worked for the Communist cause before his capture and execution by the Imperial Japanese Army during World War II. He is also the father of Dai Qing (戴晴), a leading activist.

Fu Daqing was born in 1900 in Linchuan, Jiangxi province. Having lost his father at an early age, the young Daqing was brought up by his mother, a school teacher. After graduating from a missionary-run high school with fluency in English, he travelled to Shanghai to continue his education. In Shanghai, he read the newspaper New Youth and met Chen Duxiu, co-founder of the Chinese Communist Party (CCP). Whilst learning Russian at the Institute of Foreign Languages, Fu joined the Socialist Youth Brigade of China in 1920.

The next year he travelled by sea to study at the Eastern University in Moscow with Liu Shaoqi and others. In Moscow Fu took the Russian name Federov and later joined the CCP. In the summer of 1924, after returning from Moscow, Fu worked for Sun Yatsen's government in Guangdong as a translator for the Soviet agent Mikhail Borodin. He was active at the Whampoa Military Academy and first participated in military operations in 1925. The following year Fu joined the Northern Expedition. After the abortive Nanchang Uprising, Fu Daqing returned to his native Linchuan to engage in propaganda work among the people. In December 1927, he participated in a failed Communist uprising in Guangzhou, after which he fled to Hong Kong. Fu went on to visit Singapore, Thailand, Indonesia, Burma and the Philippines. On 29 April 1930 Fu Daqing co-founded the South Seas Communist Party (predecessor to the Communist parties of Indochina, Malaya and Siam) with Ho Chi Minh and eighteen others. Later he became a propaganda officer for the party, co-editing The Malayan Worker. The British authorities had him arrested and deported back to China, where he was imprisoned firstly at Guangzhou and then at Shanghai by the Kuomintang.

At the outbreak of the Second Sino-Japanese War, he was released from gaol. Fu Daqing made his way to Wuhan where he worked for the Communist Eighth Route Army. After the fall of Wuhuan in 1938 he moved to Guiyang and Guilin to engage in anti-Japanese propaganda. Later he moved to Yan'an, where he translated Carl von Clausewitz's classic treatise On War into Chinese, receiving praise from CCP commanders Zhu De and Ye Jianying. In 1940 Fu Daqing met Yang Jie (楊潔), a female colleague in Chongqing, and the two began living together. The couple married on New Year's Day 1941. In June 1941 he was dispatched by the Central Committee to Beiping to engage in propaganda activities and underground communication with the Comintern. Two months later, Yang Jie gave birth to a daughter, Dai Qing. The family was reunited at the end of the year in Beiping.

On July 23, 1944, both Fu and his wife were captured by the Imperial Japanese Army. He was executed sometime before the end of World War II. The CCP only learned of this from captured Japanese archives. Having held no official position in the CCP, Fu Daqing is best remembered for his expertise in linguistics. He spoke English, Russian, Malay as well as a number of Chinese dialects, including Cantonese and Hainanese. Fu's daughter Dai Qing was later adopted by his good friend Ye Jianying.
