= Empress Dowager Fu (Later Zhou) =

Empress Fu

Empress consort of Later Zhou
- Tenure: 17 July 959 – 27 July 959
- Predecessor: Elder Empress Fu (sister)

Empress dowager of Later Zhou
- Tenure: 28 July 959 – 3 February 960
- Monarch: Guo Zongxun (stepson)
- Died: 993
- Spouse: Guo Rong
Names
- Surname: Fú (符); Given name: unknown
- Father: Fu Yanqing

Empress Fu (符皇后, given name unknown, c. 932–993) was an empress consort and empress dowager during the Later Zhou dynasty. She served as regent during the minority of her stepson emperor Guo Zongxun between 959 and 960.

== Life ==
She was a daughter of general Fu Yanqing and a younger sister of Empress Xuanyi (Empress Fu the Elder), who was married to the Later Zhou emperor Guo Rong (Chai Rong) from 951 or so (before he became the emperor in 954) to 956. Guo Rong had been without a wife ever since Empress Xuanyi's death in 956, and he married the younger Fu in July 959 when he fell critically ill. The marriage was clearly political and most likely not consummated: Guo Rong died 10 days later and was succeeded by his 6-year-old son Guo Zongxun. Empress Dowager Fu as his guardian became the regent.

During her reign, she relied heavily on the advice of chief ministers Fan Zhi, Wang Pu, and Wei Renpu. Half a year later, general Zhao Kuangyin staged a coup and usurped the Later Zhou throne, establishing the Song dynasty. The empress dowager and the child emperor were exiled to the Western Capital (Luoyang) where they lived out the rest of their lives. After Guo Zongxun's death in 973, she became a Taoist nun with the title Master Yuqing (玉清仙師). She died in 993, during the reign of Emperor Taizong of Song, who was married to another sister of hers before 975.

== Notes and references ==
=== Sources ===
- (in Chinese) Xue Juzheng; et al., eds. (974). Wudai Shi (五代史) [History of the Five Dynasties].
- (in Chinese) Ouyang Xiu (1073). Wudai Shiji (五代史記) [Historical Records of the Five Dynasties].
- (in Chinese) Sima Guang (1086). Zizhi Tongjian (資治通鑑) [Comprehensive Mirror for Aid in Government].
