= Empress Fu (Ai) =

Empress of Han China from 6 to 1 BC

Empress Xiaoai 孝哀皇后
- Spouse: Emperor Ai of Han
Posthumous name
- Empress Xiao'ai (孝哀皇后)
- Father: Fu Yan, Marquess of Kongxiang

Empress Fu (傅皇后) (Note: The name Fu Daijun (傅黛君) does not appear on historical records.) (died September or October 1 BC), formally Empress Xiao'ai (孝哀皇后), was an Empress during Han dynasty. Her husband was Emperor Ai of Han, but they had no children, and their marriage was possibly not even consummated because he was homosexual.

== Life ==
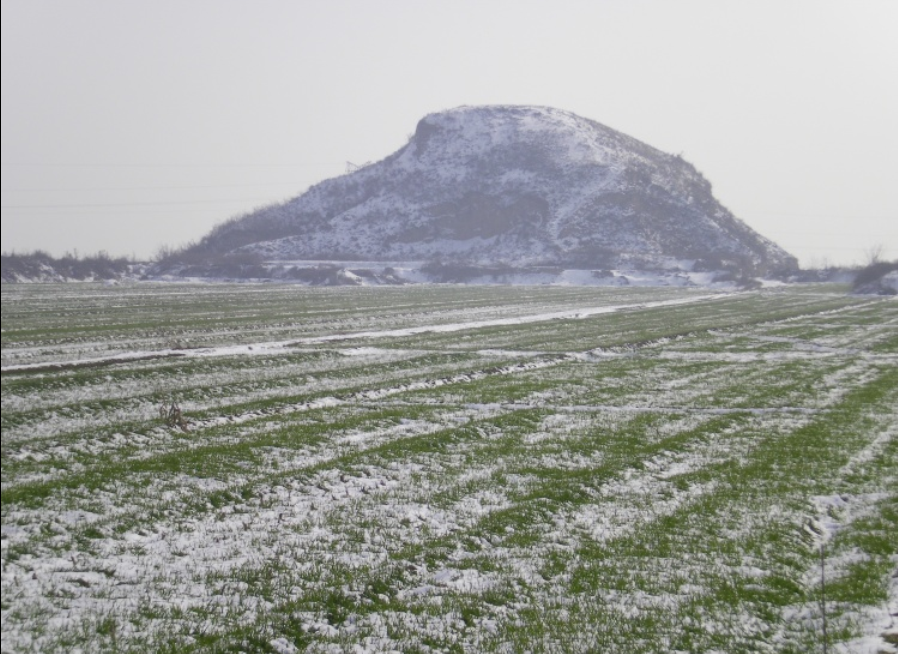
The tomb of Empress Fu, east of Emperor Ai's tomb in Yiling (義陵), Xianyang, Shaanxi

Empress Fu was the daughter of her husband's grandmother Consort Fu’s cousin Fu Yan (傅晏). She became his consort when he was still the Prince of Dingtao and later crown prince. After the death of his uncle Emperor Cheng in April 7 BC, he ascended the throne as Emperor Ai, and she was created his empress that same year on 16 June. Her father created the Marquess of Kongxiang.

By the time Emperor Ai died in August 1 BC, Empress Fu's main support, Consort Fu, had already been dead for many months, and she suddenly was all alone as her father and her other relatives were purged from the government by Wang Mang. Wang, who bore grudges against Fu and Ai, did not permit her to become empress dowager, and a brief time after Ai's death, he had her demoted to commoner status and ordered her to guard her husband's tomb—even though she was not personally involved in any of the political intrigues. She committed suicide that day.

Chinese royalty
Preceded by Empress Zhao Feiyan	Empress of Western Han Dynasty; 16 Jun 6 – Aug 1 BC	Succeeded by Empress Wang
