= 0s =

First 9 years of the Common Era

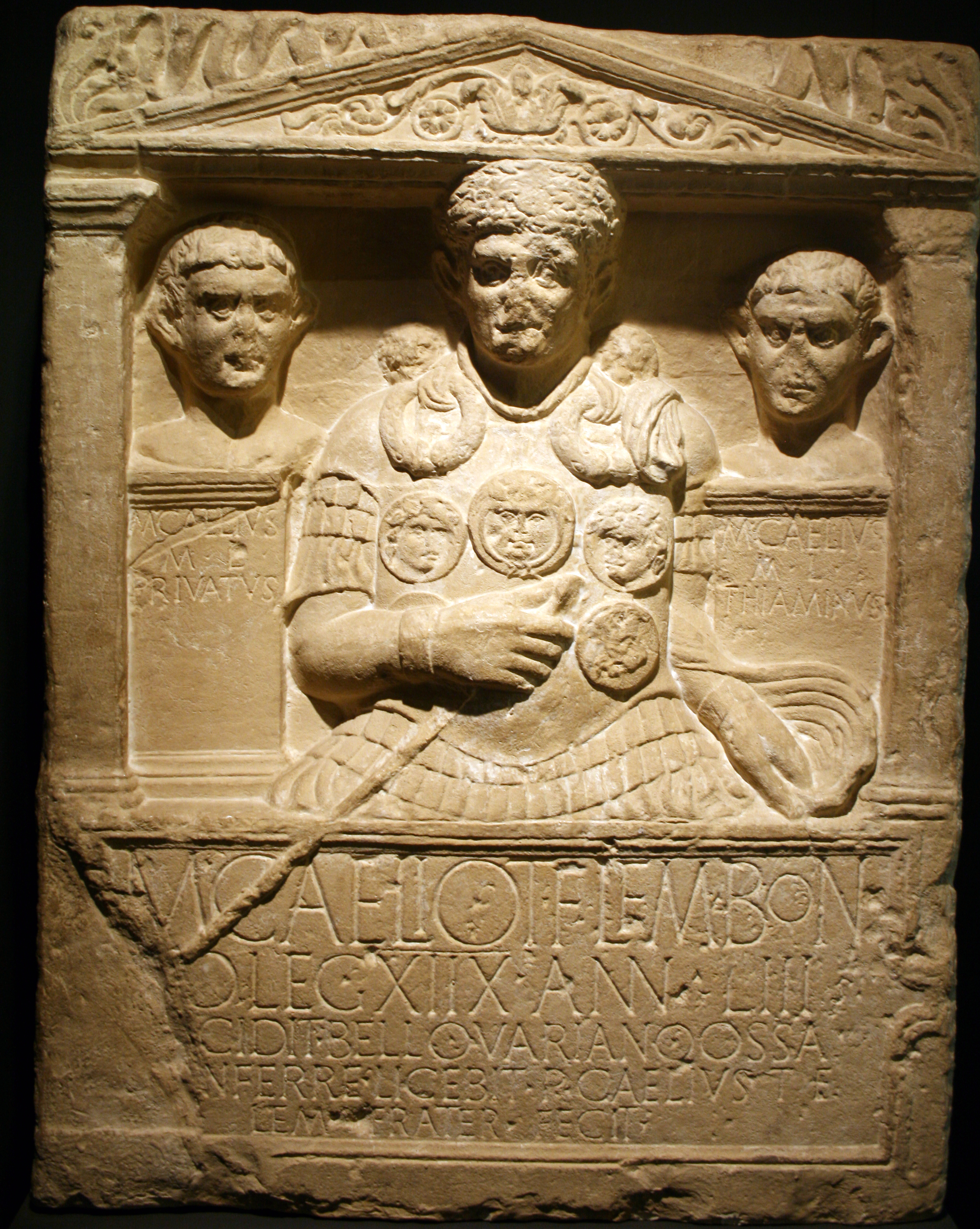
Cenotaph of Marcus Caelius, a centurion who died in the Battle of the Teutoburg Forest (AD 9). Teutoburg Forest is commonly seen as one of the most important defeats in Roman history, bringing the triumphant period of expansion under Augustus to an abrupt end. The outcome of this battle dissuaded the Romans from their ambition of conquering Germania, and is thus considered one of the most important events in European history.

The 0s began on January 1, AD 1 and ended on December 31, AD 9, covering the first nine years of the Common Era.

In Europe, the 0s saw the continuation of conflict between the Roman Empire and Germanic tribes in the Early Imperial campaigns in Germania. Vinicius, Tiberius and Varus led Roman forces in multiple punitive campaigns, before sustaining a major defeat at the hands of Arminius in the Battle of the Teutoburg Forest. Concurrently, the Roman Empire fought the Bellum Batonianum against a rebelling alliance of native peoples led by Bato the Daesitiate in Illyricum, which was suppressed in AD 9. A conflict also took place in Korea, where Daeso, King of Dongbuyeo invaded Goguryeo with a 50,000-man army in AD 6. He was forced to retreat when heavy snow began to fall, stopping the conflict until the next decade. In China, the last ruler of the Chinese Western Han dynasty (Ruzi Ying) was deposed, allowing Wang Mang to establish the Xin dynasty.

Literary works from the 0s include works from the ancient Roman poet Ovid: the Ars Amatoria, an instructional elegy series in three books, Metamorphoses, a poem which chronicles the history of the world from its creation to the deification of Julius Caesar within a loose mythico-historical framework, and Ibis, a curse poem written during his years in exile across the Black Sea for an offense against Augustus. Nicolaus of Damascus wrote the 15-volume History of the World.

Estimates for the world population by AD 1 range from 170 to 300 million. A census was concluded in China in AD 2: final numbers showed a population of nearly 60 million (59,594,978 people in slightly more than 12 million households). The census is one of the most accurate surveys in Chinese history.

== Calendar details ==
Because there is no year zero in the Gregorian calendar, this period is one of two "1-to-9" decade-like timespans that contain only nine years, along with the 0s BC. The Anno Domini (AD) calendar era which numbers these years 1–9 was devised by Dionysius Exiguus in 525, and became widely used in Christian Europe in the 9th century. Dionysius assigned BC 1 to be the year he believed Jesus was born (or according to at least one scholar, AD 1). Modern scholars disagree with Dionysius' calculations, placing the event several years earlier (see Chronology of Jesus).

Errors applying leap years in the Julian Calendar affect parts of this 1-to-9 timespan. As a result, sources differ as to whether, for example, AD 1 was a common year starting on Saturday or Sunday. It was a common year starting on Saturday by the proleptic Julian calendar, and a common year starting on Monday by the proleptic Gregorian calendar. It is the epoch year for the Anno Domini (AD) Christian calendar era, and the 1st year of the 1st century and 1st millennium of the Christian or Common Era (CE).

== Politics and wars ==
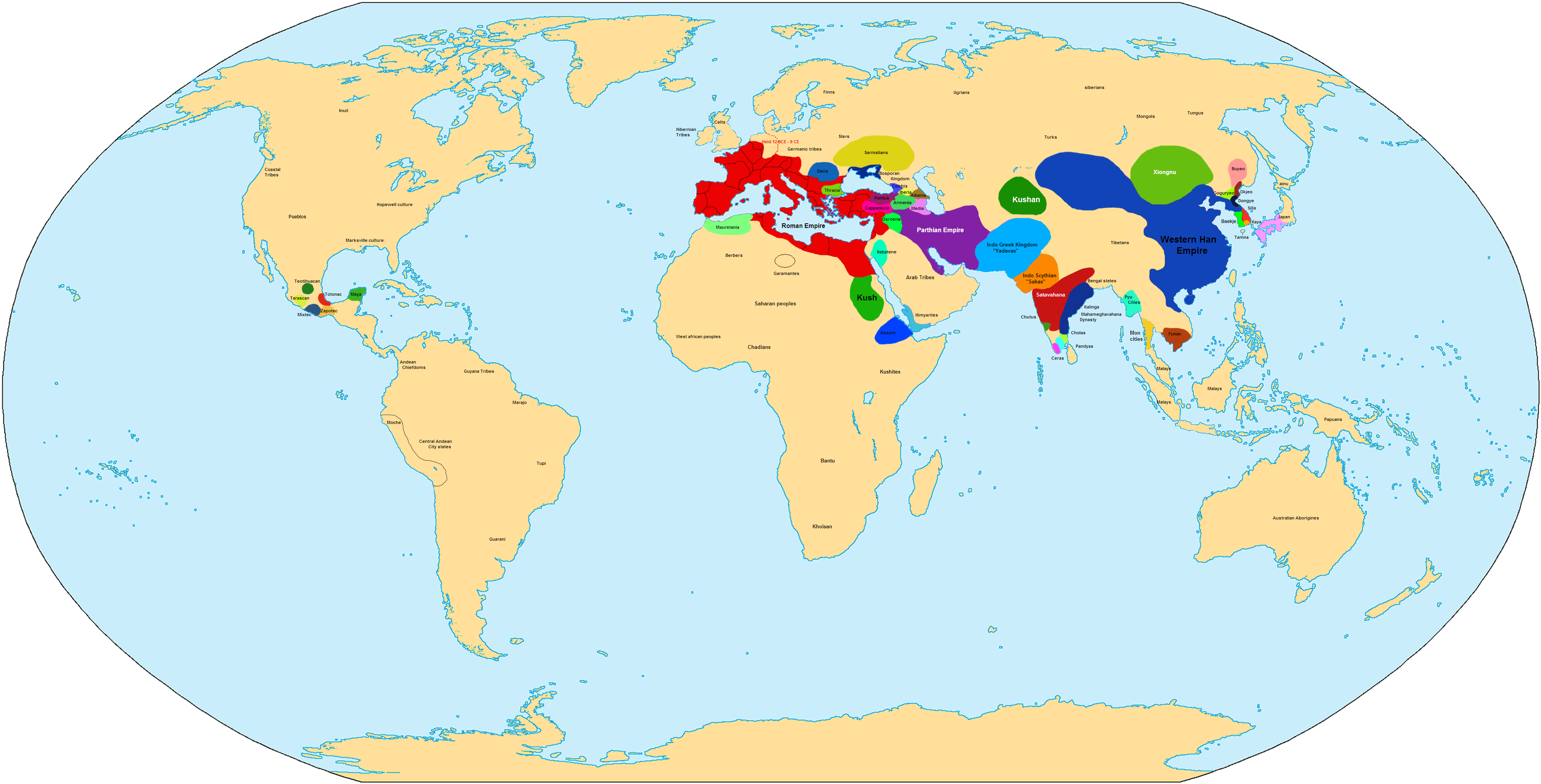
Map of the world in 1 AD

=== Heads of state ===
For brevity, only the most powerful and hegemonic states of the period are included. See list of state leaders in the 1st century for a broader list. Furthermore, the last year of a reign is excluded from this table if it lasted multiple years.

Polity	AD 1	AD 2	AD 3	AD 4	AD 5	AD 6	AD 7	AD 8	AD 9
Roman Empire	Augustus								
Chinese Empire	Ping					Ruzi Ying			Wang Mang
Parthian Empire	Phraates IV	Phraates V and Musa			(none)	Orodes III	(none)	Vonones I	

=== Wars ===
Start	Finish	Name of Conflict	Description
6 AD	9 AD	Bellum Batonianum	
12 BC	AD 16	Early imperial campaigns in Germania: Battle of the Teutoburg Forest	By AD 1, the Roman Empire had been expanding its territories and exerting influence throughout Europe, including regions bordering the Rhine River. The Romans sought to consolidate their control over Germanic territories east of the Rhine and integrate them into the empire. Between 2 BC and AD 4, Vinicius commanded five legions in Germany, successfully leading them in the "vast war" against Germanic tribes. He was awarded the ornamenta triumphalia upon his return to Rome. In AD 4, Tiberius took command and waged campaigns in northern Germany, conquering several tribes and establishing alliances. The Cherusci tribe, including the influential Arminius, became friends with Rome. Tiberius built a winter base on the Lippe to monitor the Cherusci. By AD 6, most German tribes were pacified, and Rome planned an attack on the Marcomanni but made peace instead. Varus replaced Tiberius and imposed civic changes, but Arminius incited a revolt. In AD 9, Varus fell into an ambush by Arminius, suffering a devastating defeat as Roman forces were surrounded and overwhelmed. Varus took his own life, while a few survivors managed to return to Roman quarters.
6 AD	21 AD	Goguryeo-Dongbuyeo Wars	As king, Daeso of Buyeo gathered enough military power to attack Goguryeo. Before attacking, however, he sent an envoy to Goguryeo's King Yuri, ordering him to send a royal hostage to Dongbuyeo. Goguryeo rejected the order leading to the first Goguryeo-Dongbuyeo war to occur in 6 AD. Daeso directly led a 50,000-man army into Goguryeo, but was forced to retreat when heavy snow began to fall. After this defeat, Daeso had to wait seven years before he could seek to regain what he had lost from the first war with Goguryeo.

== Events ==
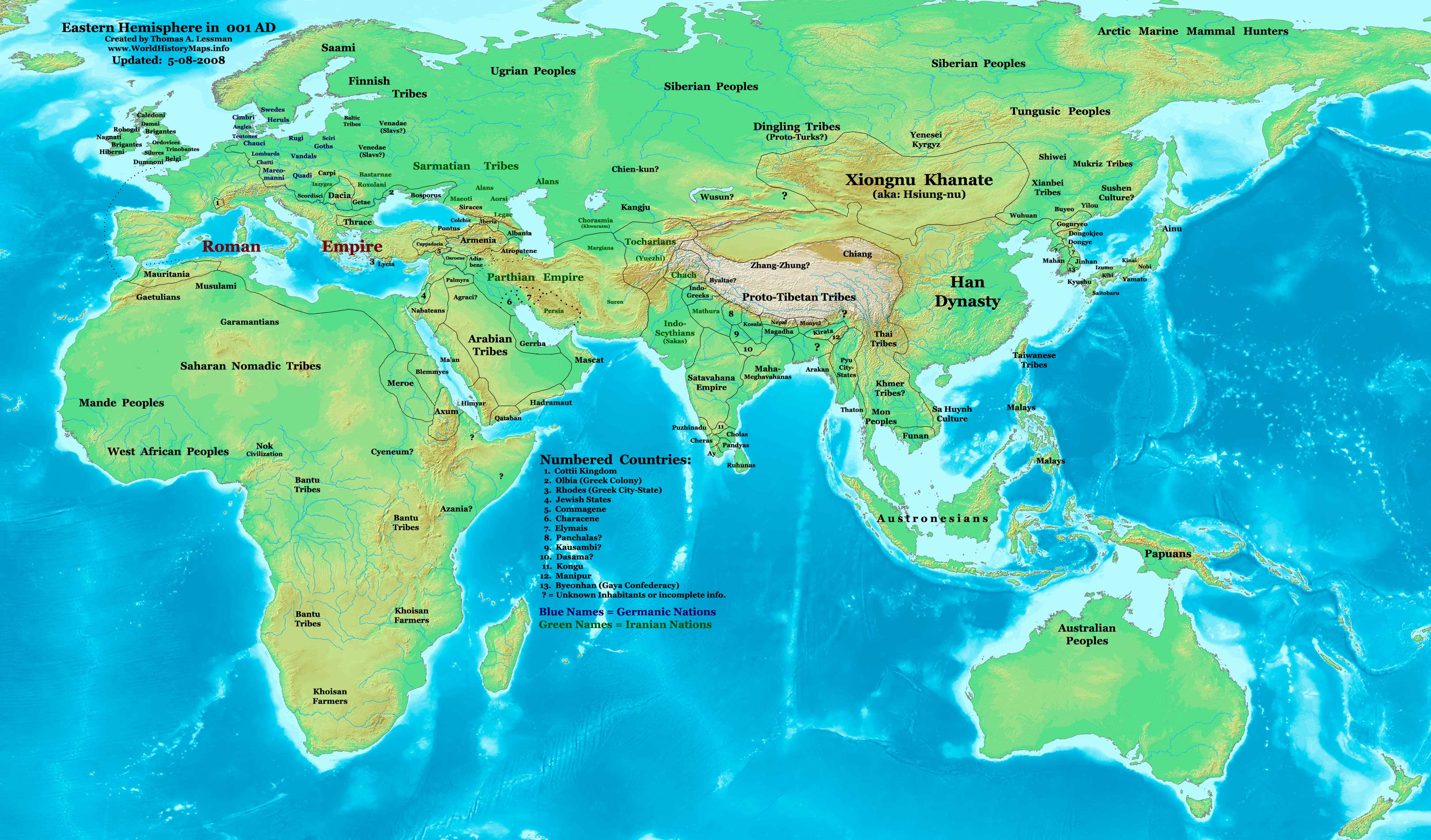
Map of the Eastern Hemisphere in AD 1.

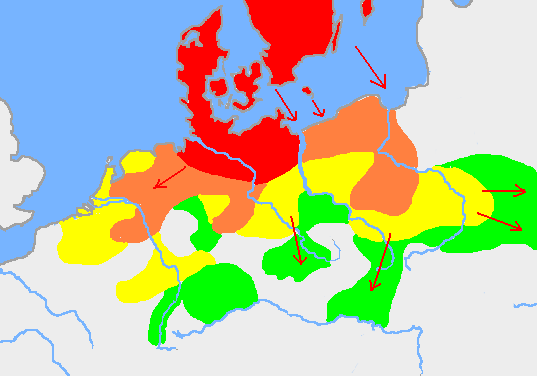
Germanic tribes in Europe in AD 1: Settlements before 750 BC New settlements after 750 BC until 1 AD New settlements until 100 AD New settlements after 100 AD

=== Africa ===
- AD 2 – Juba II of Mauretania joins Gaius Caesar in Armenia as a military advisor. It is during this period that he meets Glaphyra, a Cappadocian princess and the former wife of Alexandros of Judea, a brother of Herod Archelaus, ethnarch of Judea, and becomes enamoured with her.
- AD 7 – The epoch of the Ethiopian calendar begins.

=== China ===
- AD 1 – Confucius is given his first royal title (posthumous name) of Baocheng Xuan Ni Gong.
- AD 2 – Wang Mang begins a program of personal aggrandizement, restoring marquess titles to past imperial princes and introducing a pension system for retired officials. Restrictions are placed on the Emperor's mother, Consort Wei and members of the Wei Clan.
- AD 2 – The first census is concluded in China after having begun the year before: final numbers show a population of nearly 60 million (59,594,978 people in slightly more than 12 million households). The census is one of the most accurate surveys in Chinese history.
- AD 3 – Wang Mang foils a plot by his son, Wang Yu, his brother-in-law, Lu Kuan, and the Wei clan to oust him from the regent's position. Wang Yu and Lu Kuan are killed in the purge that follows.
- AD 4 – Emperor Ping of Han marries Empress Wang (Ping), daughter of Wang Mang, cementing his influence.
- AD 4 – Wang Mang is given the title "superior duke".
- AD 6, January – Some Chinese fear for the life of the young, ailing Emperor Ping Di as the planet Mars disappears behind the moon this month.
- AD 6, February 3 – The boy emperor, Ping Di, dies of unexpected causes at age 14; Wang Mang alone selects the new emperor, Ruzi Ying, age 2, starting the Jushe era of the Han dynasty.
- AD 6 – Candidates for government office must take civil-service examinations.
- AD 6 – The imperial Liu clan suspects the intentions of Wang Mang and foment agrarian rebellions during the course of Ruzi Ying's reign. The first of these is led by Liu Chong, Marquess of Ang-Zong (a/k/a Marquis of An-chung), with a small force starting in May or June.
- AD 7 – Zhai Yi, Governor of the Commandery of Dong (modern Puyang, Henan) declares Liu Zin, Marquess of Yang Xiang (modern Tai'an, Shandong), emperor. This proves to be the largest of the rebellions against Emperor Ruzi of Han.
- AD 7 – Wang Mang puts down the rebellion during the winter. Zhai is captured and executed while Liu Xin escapes.
- AD 8 – Start of Chushi era of the Chinese Han dynasty.
- AD 8 – Wang Mang crushes a rebellion by Chai I, and on the winter solstice (which has been dated January 10 of the following year) officially assumes the title emperor, establishing the short-lived Xin dynasty.
- AD 9, January 10 – Wang Mang founds the short-lived Xin dynasty in China (until AD 25). Wang Mang names his wife, Wang, empress and his son, Wang Lin Crown Prince, heir to the throne.
- AD 9 – Empress Wang is given the title of Duchess Dowager of Ding'an, while Ruzi Ying, the former Emperor of Han, becomes the Duke of Ding'an. Ruzi Ying is placed under house arrest.

=== Europe ===
- AD 8 – Tincomarus, deposed king of the Atrebates, flees Britain for Rome; Eppillus becomes king.

=== Korea ===
- AD 4 – Namhae Chachaung succeeds Bak Hyeokgeose as king of the Korean kingdom of Silla (traditional date).

=== Persia ===
- AD 2 - Vonones I, who had been installed as king of the Parthian Empire after a period of exile in Rome, was deposed by the Mahestan, the Parthian noble council. His Romanized policies and mannerisms were unpopular among the Parthian aristocracy, prompting the council to replace him with Artabanus III, a more traditional Parthian ruler.
- AD 4 – King Phraataces and Queen Musa of Parthia are overthrown and killed, the crown being offered to Orodes III of Parthia—the beginning of the interregnum.
- AD 7 – Vonones I becomes ruler of the Parthian Empire (approximate date).
- AD 8 – Vonones I becomes king (shah) of the Parthian Empire.

=== Roman Empire ===
- AD 1 – Tiberius, under order of Emperor Augustus, quells revolts in Germania (AD 1–5).
- AD 1 – Gaius Caesar meets with Phraates V, the king of Parthia, on the Euphrates. Rather than invading the Parthians, Gaius Caesar concludes peace with them; Parthia recognizes Roman claims to Armenia.
- AD 1 – Birth of Jesus, as assigned by Dionysius Exiguus in his anno Domini era according to at least one scholar. However, most scholars think that Dionysius placed the birth of Jesus in the previous year, 1 BC. Furthermore, most modern scholars do not consider Dionysius' calculations authoritative, placing the event several years earlier (see Chronology of Jesus).
- AD 2 – Following the death of Lucius Caesar, Augustus allows his stepson Tiberius back into Rome as a private citizen, after six years of enforced retirement on Rhodes.
- AD 2 – Maison Carrée, Nîmes, France, is built.
- AD 3 – The rule of Emperor Augustus is renewed for a ten-year period.
- AD 4 – Emperor Augustus summons Tiberius to Rome, and names him his heir and future emperor. At the same time, Agrippa Postumus, the last son of Marcus Vipsanius Agrippa, is also adopted and named as Augustus' heir.
- AD 4 – Tiberius also adopts Germanicus as his own heir.
- AD 4 – The Lex Aelia Sentia regulates the manumission of slaves.
- AD 4 – A pact of non-aggression and friendship is signed between the Roman Empire, represented by Tiberius, and the German tribe the Cherusci, represented by their King Segimer. Arminius and Flavus, sons of Segimer, are brought into the Roman army as leaders of the auxiliary troops.
- AD 4 – Julia the Elder returns from exile to live in Rhegium in disgrace.
- AD 4 – Livilla marries Drusus Julius Caesar, son of Tiberius.
- AD 4 – Nicolaus of Damascus writes the 15-volume History of the World.
- AD 5 – Rome acknowledges Cunobelinus, king of the Catuvellauni, as king of Britain.
- AD 5 – The Germanic tribes of Cimbri and Charydes send ambassadors to Rome.
- AD 5 – Tiberius conquers Germania Inferior.
- AD 5 – Agrippina the Elder marries Germanicus, her second cousin.
- AD 6 – Due to a catastrophic fire in Rome, the barracks system - the vigiles, initially manned only by freedmen - is created by the Princeps Augustus to allow quicker response to outbreaks of fire in the city.
- AD 6 – Due to a food shortage in Rome, Augustus doubles the grain rations distributed to the people, sends away his slave retinue, and places the senate in recess indefinitely.
- AD 6 – The Princeps Augustus sets up a treasury, the aerarium militare (170 million sestertii), with the specific purpose of paying bonuses to retiring legion veterans. This is financed by a 5% tax on inheritances, a system said to have been suggested in Julius Caesar's memoirs.
- AD 6 – The Temple of Castor and Pollux is rededicated in Rome by Tiberius after being destroyed by fire in 14 BC.
- AD 6 – A pamphletting campaign in Rome is quashed by the Princeps Augustus. Publius Plautius Rufus is accused but found innocent of the crime.
- AD 6 – Princeps Augustus banishes Agrippa Postumus, one of his adopted sons, to the island of Planasia.
- AD 6 – Tiberius makes Carnuntum his base of operations against Maroboduus; The Roman legion XX Valeria Victrix fight with Tiberius against the Marcomanni.
- AD 6 – The building of a Roman fort signifies the origin of the city of Wiesbaden.
- AD 6 – The Illyrian tribes in Dalmatia and Pannonia revolt and begin the Bellum Batonianum or Great Illyrian Revolt.
- AD 6 – Troops are levied in Rome to send to Illyricum from freedmen and slaves freed specifically for the purpose.
- AD 6 – Tiberius marches back from the northern border to Illyricum to commence operations against the Illyrians.
- AD 6 – Gaius Caecina Severus is made governor of Moesia, and is heavily involved in the first battles of the Bellum Batonianum or Great Illyrian Revolt.
- AD 6 – Marcus Plautius Silvanus is made governor of Galatia and Pamphylia and suppresses an uprising of the Isaurians in Pamphylia.
- AD 6 – Herod Archelaus, ethnarch of Samaria, Judea, and Idumea, is deposed and banished to Vienne in Gaul.
- AD 6 – Iudaea and Moesia become Roman provinces.
- AD 6 – Quirinius conducts a census in Judea (according to Josephus), which results in a revolt in the province, led by Judas of Galilee, and supported by the Pharisee Zadok. The revolt is repressed, and the rebels are crucified, but it results in the birth of the Zealot movement, the members of which regard the God of Judaism as their only master.
- AD 7 – Illyrian tribes in Pannonia and Dalmatia continue the Great Illyrian Revolt against Roman rule.
- AD 7 – Publius Quinctilius Varus is appointed governor of Germania, charged with organizing Germania between the Rhine and Elbe rivers. He carries out a census, devises tributes and recruits soldiers, all of which creates dissension among the Germanic tribes.
- AD 7 – Abgarus of Edessa is deposed as king of Osroene.
- AD 7 – Construction of the Temple of Concord begins.
- AD 8, August 3 – Roman general Tiberius defeats the Illyrians in Dalmatia on the River Bathinus, but the Great Illyrian Revolt continues.
- AD 8 – Vipsania Julia is exiled. Lucius Aemilius Paullus and his family are disgraced. Augustus breaks off the engagement of Claudius to Paullus' daughter Aemilia Lepida. An effort is made to betroth Claudius to Livia Medullina Camilla.
- AD 8 – After completing Metamorphoses, Ovid begins the Fasti (Festivals), 6 books that detail the first 6 months of the year and provide valuable insights into the Roman calendar.
- AD 8 – Roman poet Ovid is banished from Rome and exiled to the Black Sea near Tomis (modern-day Constanța).
- AD 9, c. September 9 – Battle of the Teutoburg Forest: Legio XVII, XVIII and XIX are lured by Arminius into an ambush and defeated by his tribe, the Cherusci, and their Germanic allies. The Roman aquilae are lost and the Roman general and governor Publius Quinctilius Varus dies by suicide. Legio II Augusta, XX Valeria Victrix, and XIII Gemina move to Germany to replace the lost legions.
- AD 9 – The Bellum Batonianum (Great Illyrian Revolt) in Dalmatia is suppressed.
- AD 9 – First record of the subdivision of the province of Illyricum into lower (Pannonia) and upper (Dalmatia) regions.
- AD 9 – In order to increase the number of marriages, and ultimately the population, the Lex Papia Poppaea is adopted in Italy. This law prohibits celibacy and childless relationships.
- AD 9 – Roman finances become strained following the Danubian insurrection and the Battle of the Teutoburg Forest, resulting in the levying of two new taxes: five percent on inheritances, and one percent on sales.
- AD 9 – Cunobeline is first recorded to be king of the Catuvellauni at Camulodunum (modern-day Colchester) in Britain.
- AD 9 – Ovid completes the curse poem Ibis.

== Demographics ==
Estimates for the world population in 1 AD range from 150 to 300 million. The below table summarizes estimates by various authors.

PRB (1973–2016)	UN (2015)	Maddison (2008)	HYDE (2010)	Tanton (1994)	Biraben (1980)	McEvedy & Jones (1978)	Thomlinson (1975)	Durand (1974)	Clark (1967)
300M	300M	231M	188M	150M	255M	170M	200M	270–330M	256M

== Significant people ==
- Erato, Artaxiad dynasty Queen of Armenia, 8–5 BC, 2 BC – 2 AD, 6–11
- Ariobarzan of Atropatene, Client King of Armenia, r. 1 BC – 2 AD
- Artavazd V, Client King of Armenia, r. 2–11
- Tigranes V, Artaxiad dynasty King of Armenia, r. 2–6
- Ping Di, Emperor of Han dynasty China, r. 1 BC – 5 AD
- Ruzi Ying, Emperor of Han dynasty China, r. 6–9
- Wang Mang, Usurper Emperor of the short-lived Xin dynasty in China r. 9–23
- Antiochus III, King of Commagene, r. 12 BC – 17 AD
- Arminius, German war chief
- Arshak II, King of Caucasian Iberia, r. 20 BC-1 AD
- Pharasmanes I, King of Caucasian Iberia, r. 1-58
- Strato II and Strato III, co-kings of the Indo-Greek Kingdom, r. 25 BC – 10 AD
- Crimthann Nia Náir, Legendary High King of Ireland, r. 8 BC – AD 9
- Cairbre Cinnchait, Legendary High King of Ireland, r. 9–14
- Suinin, Legendary Emperor of Japan, r. 29 BC – 70 AD
- Natakamani, King of Kush, r. (1 BC – AD 20)
- Abgar V of Edessa, King of Osroene, 4 BC–AD 7, 13–50
- Ma'nu IV, King of Osroene, 7–13
- Phraates V, King of the Parthian Empire, r. 2 BC – 4 AD
- Musa of Parthia, mother and co-ruler with Phraates V, r. 2 BC – 4 AD
- Orodes III, King of the Parthian Empire, r. 4–6
- Vonones I, King of the Parthian Empire, r. 8–12
- Artabanus of Parthia, pretender to the Parthian throne and future King of Parthia
- Caesar Augustus, Roman Emperor (27 BC – AD 14)
- Gaius Caesar, Roman general
- Livy, Roman historian
- Ovid, Roman poet
- Quirinius, Roman nobleman and politician
- Hillel the Elder, Jewish scholar and Nasi of the Sanhedrin, in office c. 31 BC – 9 AD
- Shammai, Jewish scholar and Av Beit Din of the Sanhedrin, in office 20 BC – 20 AD
- Tiberius, Roman general, statesman, and future emperor
- Hyeokgeose, King of Silla, r. 57 BC – 4 AD
- Namhae, King of Silla, r. 4–24

== Births ==
- AD 1 – Sextus Afranius Burrus, Roman praetorian prefect (d. AD 62)
- AD 1 – Izates II, King of Adiabene (d. AD 54)
- AD 1 – Seneca the Younger, Roman stoic philosopher born in Cordoba (d. AD 65)
- August 16, AD 2 – Deng Yu, Chinese general and statesman (d. AD 58)
- February 8, AD 3 – Ban Biao, Chinese historian and official (d. AD 54)
- AD 3 – Geng Yan, Chinese general of the Han dynasty (d. AD 58)
- AD 3 – Tiberius Claudius Balbilus, Roman politician and astrologer (d. AD 79)
- AD 4 – Columella, Roman Latin writer (d. AD 70)
- AD 4 – Daemusin, Korean king of Goguryeo (d. AD 44)
- AD 4 – Publius Quinctilius Varus the Younger, Roman nobleman (d. AD 27)
- AD 4 (Possible date) – Jesus, Jewish preacher and religious leader (executed c. AD 30/33)
- AD 5 – Habib the Carpenter, Syrian disciple, martyr
- AD 5 – Paul the Apostle, Jewish leader of the Christians
- AD 5 – Ruzi Ying, great-grandson of Xuan of Han (d. AD 25)
- AD 5 – Yin Lihua, empress of the Han dynasty (d. AD 64)
- AD 6 – Gaius Manlius Valens, Roman senator and consul (d. AD 96)
- AD 6 – John the Apostle, Jewish Christian mystic (d. AD 100)
- AD 6 – Marcus Aemilius Lepidus, Roman politician (d. AD 39)
- AD 6 – Milonia Caesonia, Roman empress (d. AD 41)
- AD 6 – Nero Julius Caesar, son of Germanicus and Agrippina the Elder (d. AD 30)
- AD 7 – Gnaeus Domitius Corbulo, Roman general (d. AD 67)
- AD 7 – Julia Livia, daughter of Drusus Julius Caesar and Livilla (d. AD 43)
- AD 8 – Drusus Caesar, member of the Julio-Claudian dynasty (d. AD 33)
- March 11, AD 8 – Titus Flavius Sabinus, Roman consul and brother of Vespasian (d. AD 69)
- AD 9, November 17 – Vespasian, Roman emperor (d. AD 79)

== Deaths ==
- AD 1 – Amanishakheto, queen of Kush (Nubia)
- AD 2, August 20 – Lucius Caesar, son of Marcus Vipsanius Agrippa and Julia the Elder (b. 17 BC)
- AD 2 – Gaius Marcius Censorinus, Roman consul (approximate date)
- AD 3 – Bao Xuan, Chinese politician of the Han dynasty
- AD 4 – February 21 – Gaius Caesar, son of Marcus Vipsanius Agrippa and Julia the Elder (b. 20 BC)
- AD 4 – June 26 – Ariobarzanes II, Roman client king of Armenia (b. 40 BC)
- AD 4 – Gaius Asinius Pollio, Roman orator, poet and historian (b. 65 BC)
- AD 4 – Hyeokgeose, Korean king of Silla (b. 75 BC)
- AD 4 – Lucius Cornelius Lentulus, Roman consul
- AD 6, February 3 – Ping, Chinese emperor of the Han dynasty (b. 9 BC)
- AD 6 – Cleopatra Selene II, Egyptian ruler of Cyrenaica and Libya (b. 40 BC)
- AD 6 – Orodes III, king (shah) of the Parthian Empire
- AD 6 – Terentia, wife of Marcus Tullius Cicero (b. 98 BC)
- AD 7 – Athenodoros Cananites, Stoic philosopher (b. 74 BC)
- AD 7 – Aulus Licinius Nerva Silianus, Roman consul
- AD 7 – Glaphyra, daughter of Archelaus of Cappadocia (approximate date)
- AD 7 – Lucius Sempronius Atratinus, Roman politician
- AD 8 – Marcus Valerius Messalla Corvinus, Roman general (b. 64 BC)
- AD 9, September 15 – Publius Quinctilius Varus, Roman general (b. 46 BC)
- AD 9 – Marcus Caelius, Roman centurion (b. c. 45 BC)

== See also ==
- 00s (disambiguation)
