= Shǐ (surname) =

Chinese family name

Shi
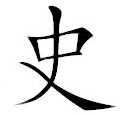
- Pronunciation: Shǐ (Mandarin); Sú (Hokkien); Si^{2} (Cantonese); Shr^{3} (Xiang)
- Language: Chinese

Origin
- Language: Chinese
- Meaning: history

Other names
- Variant forms: Shi, Shih (Mandarin); Sze, Si (Cantonese)

Shǐ (史) is a Chinese surname meaning "history" of "official historiographer". It is romanized Shih in Wade–Giles, or Sze or Si in Cantonese romanization. According to a 2008 study, it was the 82nd most common name in China. A 2013 study found that it is shared by 2.85 million people, or 0.210% of the population, with the province with the most people being Henan. It is the 63rd name on the Hundred Family Surnames poem.

== Origins ==
1. It is said to be borne by descendants of Cang Jie, the official historiographer during the reign of the mythical Huang Di, the ‘Yellow Emperor’
2. Shi (史), post name of an official in charge of recording historical events during the Western Zhou dynasty. Later, the surname was subsequently adopted as a surname by descendants of official historiographers in many regional states during the Spring and Autumn period
3. adopted as a surname by the Sogdians, and became one of the "Nine Sogdian Surnames", also known as ‘nine surnames of Zhaowu’
4. adopted as a surname by the Ashina tribe (阿史那), a Turkic tribe during the Tang dynasty
5. descendants of Shi Ji (史繼), who was bestowed with the surname by Emperor Suzong of Tang

== Notable people ==
- Empress Shi (Xin dynasty) (史皇后), empress during the Xin dynasty
- Shi Dongpeng (史冬鹏), a Chinese hurdler who specializes in the 110 metre hurdles.
- Shi Zhi (史侄), a Zhou-era public officer
- Shi Siming (史思明), emperor of the Yan dynasty
- Shi Miyuan (史彌遠), politician during the Southern Song dynasty
- Shi Kefa (史可法), politician during the Southern Ming dynasty
- Shi Liangcai (史量才, 1880–1934), a journalist
- Shi Meng (史萌), athlete from the People's Republic of China who competes in triathlon
- Shi Liang (footballer) (史亮), a footballer
- Shi Jiuyong (史久镛), an International Court of Justice judge
- Shi Liang (史良), Chinese lawyer, activist, and first Minister of Justice of the People's Republic of China
- Yuanchun Shi (史元春), Chinese computer scientist
