= Consort Shi =

Consort Shi may refer to:

- Xi Shi (fl. 5th century BC), (possibly fictional) consort of Fuchai of Wu
- Empress Shi (fl. 23), wife of Wang Mang (only emperor of Xin)
- Princess Shi (fl. 380s), wife of Lü Guang (Emperor Yiwu of Later Liang)
- Queen Dowager Shi (died c. 920), concubine of Yang Xingmi
