= Empress Xiaomu =

Empress Xiaomu or Empress Xiao Mu may refer to:

- Empress Xiaomucheng (died 1808), first wife of the Daoguang Emperor of the Qing Dynasty
- Empress Wang (Xin Dynasty) (1st-century BC–21 AD), empress of the Xin Dynasty
