= Empress Shi =

Empress of China in 23 CE

- Chinese: 史皇后
- Literal meaning: empress of the Shi family
Transcriptions
Standard Mandarin
- Hanyu Pinyin: Shǐ Huánghòu
- Wade–Giles: Shih Huang-hou

Empress Shi (Note: Empress Shi's personal name is unrecorded by history.) (fl. 23 CE) was empress of China during the final months of the brief Xin dynasty. She married the Xin emperor Wang Mang in the spring of 23, as his empire was crumbling to agrarian revolts. Despite that, he married her as a public show of confidence. She was the daughter of one of his officials, Shi Chen (史諶).

In the autumn of 23, the Xin capital Chang'an fell to Lulin rebels acting in concert with members of the Han's imperial Liu family. Wang Mang died in the battle at Weiyang Palace. It is unrecorded what happened to Empress Shi, although it is known that her father Shi Chen surrendered to the Han forces and was then executed.

== Notes ==
Chinese royalty
Preceded by Empress Wang	Empress of the Xin dynasty 23	Dynasty ended
Preceded by Empress Wang	Empress of China; 23	Succeeded by Guo Shengtong of the Eastern Han dynasty
