= Zhongshan Kingdom (Han dynasty) =

Kingdom of the Han dynasty

Changxin Palace Lamp (长信宫灯), unearthed from the tomb of Liu Sheng.

Zhongshan Kingdom or Zhongshan Principality (Chinese: 中山國) was a kingdom of the Han dynasty, located in present-day southern Hebei province.

The kingdom was carved out of Changshan Commandery in 154 BC and granted to Liu Sheng, son of the reigning Emperor Jing. In 55 BC, the last Prince of Zhongshan in Liu Sheng's lineage died without issue, and the kingdom was abolished. In 46 BC, however, the territory was granted to Liu Jing, son of Emperor Xuan, as his fief. Jing also left no issue, and the kingdom was subsequently granted to Liu Xing (劉興), son of Emperor Yuan. In 1 BC, Liu Kan, the heir to the Zhongshan Kingdom, was enthroned as Emperor Ping, and Liu Chengdu (劉成都), another member of the imperial family, became the new Prince of Zhongshan. He was deposed after Wang Mang's usurpation.

After the restoration of Eastern Han, the kingdom was reestablished. It was initially awarded to Liu Mao (劉茂), one of Emperor Guangwu's fellow rebels against Wang Mang. Later, Mao was demoted to the rank of marquis, and the territory went to Liu Fu (劉輔), the emperor's second son. Fu was moved to Pei soon later, and his brother Liu Yan (劉焉) succeeded him as the Prince of Zhongshan. Yan's lineage held Zhongshan until the year 174, when the last prince died without issue. Zhongshan was subsequently converted to a commandery.

In late Western Han, it administered 14 counties: Lunu (盧奴), Beiping (北平), Beixincheng (北新成), Tang (唐), Shenze (深澤), Kuxing (苦陘), Anguo (安國), Quni (曲逆), Wangdu (望都), Xinshi (新市), Xinchu (新處), Wuji (毋極), Lucheng (陸成) and Anxian (安險). The total population in 2 AD was 668,080, or 160,873 households.

Zhongshan again became a kingdom/principality in the Cao Wei and Western Jin dynasties. The Book of Jin recorded a population of 32,000 households in 280. The region was lost in the Disaster of Yongjia.
