= Empress Wang (Ping) =

Empress of Han China from 4 to 6 AD

- Born: 8 BC
- Died: 5 October 23 AD (aged around 30); Weiyang Palace, Chang'an, Xin dynasty
- Spouse: Emperor Ping of Han
- House: House of Wang (by birth); House of Liu (by marriage)
- Father: Wang Mang
- Mother: Lady Wang

Empress Wang (王皇后) (Note: Lady Wang's name was not recorded in history.)(8 BC (Note: Lady Wang's biography in Book of Han indicated that she was 18 (by East Asian reckoning) when she was made Duchess Dowager of Ding'an.) – 5 October 23 AD), formally Empress Xiaoping (孝平皇后), formally during her father Wang Mang's Xin dynasty Duchess Dowager of Ding'an (定安太后) then Princess Huanghuang (黃皇室主), was an empress during the Han dynasty and the last empress of the Western Han dynasty. She was the daughter of the eventual usurper Wang Mang, who established the Xin dynasty. Her husband was Emperor Ping. She is largely viewed by historians as a tragic figure, the victim of circumstances who tried to remain loyal to her husband of only a few years, but whose faithfulness to her husband's dynasty eventually led her to commit suicide at the end of her father's reign.

== Family background ==
Empress Wang was born in 8 BC, to Wang Mang and his wife Lady Wang, the daughter of Wang Xian (王咸) the Marquess of Yichun. By the time of her birth, her father had resigned from his powerful position as commander of the armed forces, which he held under his cousin Emperor Cheng and briefly under Emperor Cheng's successor and nephew Emperor Ai. Her father was hated by Emperor Ai's grandmother Grand Empress Dowager Fu. However, in 1 BC, after Emperor Ai's death, Wang Mang's aunt Grand Empress Dowager Wang seized power back from Emperor Ai's male favourite (and probable lover) Dong Xian and recalled Wang Mang to serve as regent to her step-grandson, the young Emperor Ping.

== Marriage ==
Once Wang Mang became regent, he built a personality cult around himself and became very popular. In 2 AD, Wang Mang decided to cement his position by having his daughter married to Emperor Ping. He declared, in accordance with ancient customs, that Emperor Ping would have one wife and 11 concubines, and started a selection process by identifying eligible noble young ladies. He disingenuously petitioned Grand Empress Dowager Wang that his daughter not be considered, and then started a petition apparently driven by the people to have his daughter selected as empress. The petitioners stormed the palace, and Grand Empress Dowager Wang, overwhelmed by the display of affection for Wang Mang, ordered that Wang Mang's daughter be made empress. On 16 March 4 AD, Emperor Ping officially married her and made her empress.

== Young widowhood and temporary status as empress dowager ==
By circa 5 AD, Emperor Ping appeared to have grown out of a heart condition that he had suffered from, and it became plain that he resented Wang Mang for slaughtering his uncles in 3 AD and not allowing his mother to visit him in the capital, Chang'an. Wang Mang therefore resolved to murder the emperor. In the winter of 5 AD, Wang Mang gave pepper wine (Note: considered in those days to be capable of chasing away evil spirits) to the 14-year-old emperor, but had the wine spiked with poison. As the emperor was suffering the effects of the poison, Wang Mang wrote a secret petition to the gods, in which he offered to substitute his life for Emperor Ping's, and then had the petition locked away. Historians generally believe that Wang Mang had two motives in doing this—to absolve himself of involvement in the poisoning if Emperor Ping recovered from the poisoning, and to leave evidence of his faithfulness for posterity. After a few days of suffering, Emperor Ping died making Empress Wang a widow at the age of 13. After Emperor Ping's death, Wang Mang assumed the unprecedented title of acting emperor (假皇帝).

In April 6 AD, Wang Mang selected Emperor Ping's cousin-once-removed (Note: a great-great-grandson of Emperor Xuan), the one-year-old Liu Ying as the next emperor (Note: to be known as Emperor Ruzi). However, using Emperor Ruzi's young age as a pretext, Wang Mang retained his role as acting emperor, while Liu Ying was given the title crown prince. Empress Wang was given the title empress dowager.

Wang Mang promised at the time that he would return the throne to Emperor Ruzi as soon as he was old enough, but on 15 January 9 AD, Wang Mang seized the throne and established the Xin dynasty. Later in 9 AD, the toddler Emperor Ruzi was created the Duke of Ding'an (定安公), and Empress Dowager Wang was given the title of Duchess Dowager of Ding'an (定安公太后).

== Life during Xin dynasty ==
Traditional historical accounts describe Empress Wang as an unhappy widow during her father's reign, still retaining her loyalty to the overthrown Han dynasty. She often claimed to be ill and refused to attend imperial gatherings. Wang Mang, believing that he could solve her unhappiness by having her remarry, changed her title from Duchess Dowager of Ding'an to Princess Huanghuang in c.December 10 AD, terminating her formal linkage with the Han dynasty. He also intended to marry her to the son of one of his important officials, Sun Jian (孫建). He instructed Sun Jian's son to dress himself well and accompany physicians to go visit Princess Huanghuang. She was greatly offended and would not receive any guests afterwards.

Also in 10 AD, another potential suitor for Princess Huanghuang would get himself in trouble for the way that he tried to marry her. Zhen Xun (甄尋), the mayor of Chang'an and the son of Wang Mang's trusted ally and friend Zhen Feng (甄豐), had designs on both greater power and Princess Huanghuang. Because Wang Mang relied on spreading false prophecies to the people to persuade them that he was entitled to be the emperor, Zhen Feng took the chance to create some false prophecies of his own. His first attempt was a prophecy that indicated that the empire should be divided into two parts, each with a viceroy—with the western empire having his father Zhen Feng as viceroy, and the eastern empire having another important official Ping Yan (平晏) as viceroy. Wang Mang, although displeased, decided to go along with this prophecy, and in fact commissioned Zhen Feng and Ping as viceroys. Having seen the positive effect of his first false prophecy, Zhen Xun created a second false prophecy—that Princess Huanghuang should be married to him. Wang Mang decided to take this chance to suppress all prophecies that did not come from him, and ordered that Zhen Xun be arrested. Zhen Feng committed suicide, while Zhen Xun fled. In 11 AD, he was finally arrested and exiled to Sanwei (三危, in modern Jiuquan, Gansu).

== Death ==
There are no further known historical records about Princess Huanghuang until 23 AD. At that time, her father's Xin dynasty was in shambles, with various rebellions rising against him. One of the strongest rebel forces, under Liu Xuan, a distant descendant of the Han dynasty imperial house, having entered the capital, Chang'an, the people of Chang'an rose against Wang Mang as well. They set fire to the main imperial palace, Weiyang Palace, and the fire quickly spread to the part of the palace where Princess Huanghuang lived. She sighed and said, "How can I again face my Han relations?" She then threw herself into the fire and died; her father was killed the day after.

== Inclusion in the Lienü Zhuan ==
Her biography was added to the Lienü Zhuan (Biographies of Exemplary Women), which was first started by the Han dynasty scholar Liu Xiang. Empress Wang's biography is part 16 of Scroll 8, titled Supplemental Biographies (新刊續列女傳).

== Notes ==
Chinese royalty
| Preceded by Empress Fu | Empress of the Western Han dynasty 16 Mar 4– Feb 6 | Vacant Dynasty interrupted |
| Preceded by Empress Fu | Empress of China; 16 Mar 4– Feb 6 | Succeeded by Empress Wang of the Xin dynasty |
