= Taxation in premodern China =

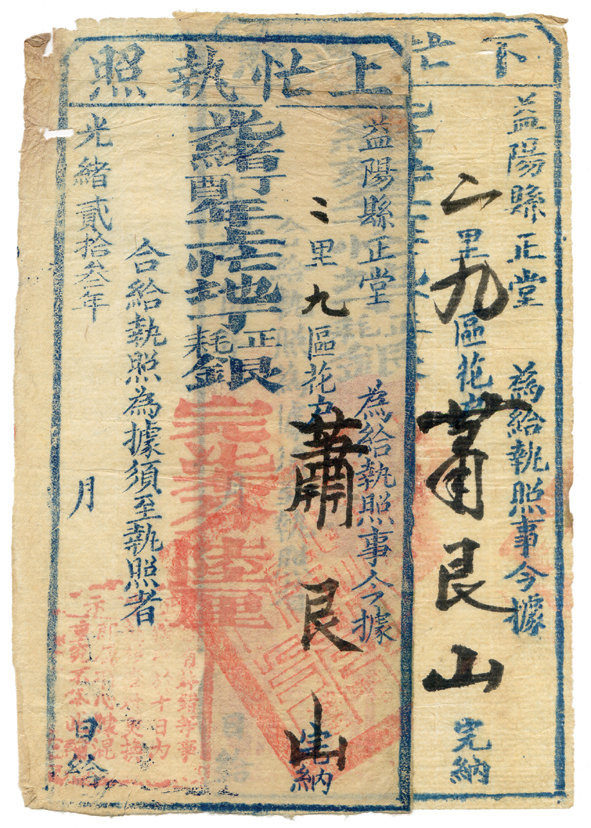
Poll tax receipts issued during the Guangxu period of the Qing dynasty.

Taxation in premodern China varied greatly over time. The most important source of state revenue was the tax on agriculture, or land tax. During some dynasties, the government also imposed monopolies that became important sources of revenue. The monopoly on salt was especially lucrative and stable. Commercial taxes were generally quite low, except in times of war. Other means of state revenues were inflation, forced labor (the corvee), and the expropriation of rich merchants and landowners. Below is a chart of the sources of state revenue in Imperial China.

== Summary of premodern taxes by dynasty ==
Premodern Chinese taxes by dynasty
Dynasty	Land tax (as % of income)	Commercial tax (as % of income)	State monopolies	Corvée	Remarks
Qin (221-206 BCE)	10%	heavy	salt, iron, coinage, forests and lakes	1 month a year	Laws aimed at discrimination of merchants, expropriation and exile of rich landowners and merchants. Heavy poll taxes. Period of interventionist policies due to Legalist influences.
Early Western Han (202-119 BCE)	0–3.3%	None (could not collect)	None	1 month every 3 years	Poll taxes; Period of laissez faire policies due to Taoist influences.
Late Western Han (119 BCE- 2 CE)	3.3%	Heavy taxes on capital and income of merchants; excise tax on alcohol	Salt, iron, coinage, grain trade	1 month every 3 years	Some expropriaton of merchants occurred under Emperor Wu, who intervened systematically in the economy due to Modernist influences.
Eastern Han (25- 220 CE)	3.3%	None	Coinage	Light; could be commuted with payments of cash	Poll taxes; Period of laissez faire policies due to Confucian influences and because the dynasty was founded with the support of rich landowners and merchants disgusted at government intervention in the late Western Han.
Six Dynasties (220-581 CE)	Variable; heavy	Miscellaneous customs taxes, taxes on capital	Coinage, iron	Heavy	Period of upheaval and division; economy regressed heavily due to the Barbarian invasions. Taxes varied in the North and South because Chinese rule was maintained in the south while barbarian tribes ruled the north.
Sui and Tang Dynasties (581-907 CE)	25%	3.3%	Iron, salt (starting after the Anshi Rebellion)	20 days a year; could be commuted with silk payments	During this period the state practiced the "equal-field system" in which most land was state owned and granted to individual farmers to prevent the formation of large estates. This allowed greater government control over the individual farmers.
Song Dynasty (960-1279 CE)	10% + "numerous surcharges"	3-4%	Salt, some foreign luxuries, tea and alcohol under Wang Anshi, paper money, sulfur.	Light; could be commuted with cash payments.	The Song was a period of high economic growth. During Wang Anshi's chancellorship, the government lent money at exorbitant rates and instituted price controls on many commodities. They were repealed after his death. The late Song suffered from high inflation due to government printing money to cover deficits.
Yuan (Mongol) Dynasty (1279-1368 CE)	Very high	Very high	Salt, tea, paper money, iron, alcohol, porcelain, bronze, gold and silver, textiles and "virtually any major industry"	Heavy	Expropriation of many Chinese landowners and merchants. Yuan China suffered from high inflation due to government printing money to cover deficits.
Ming Dynasty(1368-1644 CE)	4-5% (higher in the later dynasty)	2% (widespread evasion)	Salt (widespread evasion; mostly abandoned by end of dynasty)	Abolished	The Ming was a period of high economic growth and laissez faire policies due to Confucian influences.
Qing (Manchu) Dynasty (1644-1911 CE)	3-4% (early Qing); 1-2% (19th Century)	2% (early part of dynasty). 2 to 10% (later part of dynasty)	Salt, foreign trade	Abolished	Prohibition on new mines except to provide employment, restriction on number of merchants, widespread expropriation of Chinese landowners and re-enserfdom of millions of tenant farmers. Likin (goods transportation tax, locally collected). The Qing state experienced economic decline and fiscal weakness in the 18th and 19th centuries.

== History ==
Business taxes were first levied in China during the Zhou dynasty (1046-256 BCE).

Guan Zhong (723-645 BCE) wrote that because taxation would reduce the people's wealth and make them dislike the government, it was better to obtain revenue by monopolizing the sale of salt, iron, forest products, and ore.

Confucian thinking generally held that taxation should be low. Chinese historiography often attributes the collapse of dynasties to the imposition of heavy taxes and levies.

Mencius (372-289 BCE) favored low taxation of the people and stated that the rulers of the warring states were imposing taxes like brigands. His view was that the agricultural tax in place but abolish all other taxes. He particularly criticized market taxes, head taxes, and housing taxes. Mencius believed the ideal tax rate was 10%.

After defeating the other six kingdoms, the Qin dynasty maintained the high taxes it had imposed in war time and imposed taxes to fund projects including the Great Wall and the Terracotta Army. Taxes and levies equaled two-thirds of farmers' crops. Discontent with these policies contributed to rebellion and ultimately the defeat of the Qin and establishment of the Han dynasty.

During the Han dynasty, Emperor Wu (156-87 BCE) collected min qian (a form of business tax) from merchants, businessmen, and handicraftsmen.

The Tang dynasty (618-907 CE) imposed yashui (a form of business tax) on intermediary agents.

In 9 CE, Emperor Wang Mang of the Xin dynasty (9 to 23 CE) established the first income tax through a 10% tax of net earnings from wild herb and fruit collection, fishing, shepherding, and various nonagricultural activities and forms of trading. People were obligated to report their taxes to the government and officials would audit these reports. The penalty for evading this tax was one year of hard labor and confiscation of the entirety of a person's property. Because it caused popular discontent, this income tax was abolished in 22 CE.

Yashui was also an important source of local government revenue during the Qing dynasty (1644–1911).

== See also ==
- History of canals in China, for their use in conveying the grain taxes
