= Empress Wang (Xin dynasty) =

Empress of China from AD 9 to 21

- Chinese: 王皇后
- Literal meaning: empress of the Wang family
Transcriptions
Standard Mandarin
- Hanyu Pinyin: Wáng Huánghòu
- Wade–Giles: Wang Huang-hou

Empress Xiaomu
- Chinese: 孝睦皇后
- Literal meaning: the Filial & Congenial Empress
Transcriptions
Standard Mandarin
- Hanyu Pinyin: Xiàomù Huánghòu
- Wade–Giles: Hsiao-mu Huang-hou

Empress Wang (Note: Lady Wang's personal name is not recorded in history.) (died January AD 21), (Note: 1st month of the 2nd year of the Dihuang era, corresponding to 3–31 January of the year 21 in the proleptic Julian calendar.) formally Empress Xiaomu, was an empress of the Xin dynasty of China from AD 9 to 21.

== Life ==
Lady Wang married her husband, the eventual Xin emperor Wang Mang while he was still a commoner—albeit a well-connected commoner, being a nephew of then-Han empress Empress Wang Zhengjun. She was a daughter of Wang Xian (王咸), the Marquess of Yichun, who was a grandson of Han prime minister Wang Xin (王訢). (Her marriage to Wang Mang is evidence that at that time, the Chinese prohibition against endogamy based on the same family name was not as strict as it was later, although their relationship is not good)

Lady Wang bore her husband at least five children—sons Wang Yu (王宇), Wang Huo (王獲), Wang An (王安), and Wang Lin (王臨), and a daughter who later became empress to Emperor Ping of Han and was given the title of Princess Huanghuang during the Xin dynasty.

Wang Mang was publicly known for his marital faithfulness, and he put on the appearance that he had no concubines or other female liaisons in addition to his wife. However, that was not true, for Wang Mang had affairs with at least three servant women and, later, a lady-in-waiting to Empress Wang. He was also known for his minimising personal expenditure which extended to his wife. In one incident when he was the commander of the armed forces under his cousin Emperor Cheng of Han, after his mother died, when Lady Wang came to greet the mourners she was in clothes that were so plain that she was mistaken for a servant.

During her husband's career, Lady Wang lost two sons at her husband's hands. Wang Huo was forced to commit suicide in 5 BC after killing a servant. Wang Yu was also forced to commit suicide, in AD 3, after the failure of a conspiracy with Emperor Ping's maternal uncles of the Wei clan to overthrow Wang Mang's dictatorial regency. Because of these tragedies, Lady Wang lamented and cried so much that eventually she grew blind.

In the year 9, after Wang Mang usurped the Han throne and declared himself the emperor of the Xin dynasty, Lady Wang was created empress. Of her two surviving sons, the younger Wang Lin was considered more capable, so Wang Mang created him crown prince, while Wang An was created the Lord of Xinjia. Due to Empress Wang's blindness, Wang Mang asked Crown Prince Lin to move into the palace to attend to her.

Empress Wang died in January of the year 21. After her death, her two surviving sons also died in the same year. Wang Lin committed suicide by the sword after his plot to kill his father was discovered, the two having shared the same mistress, Empress Wang's lady-in-waiting Yuan Bi (原碧). Wang An died of natural causes. Empress Wang's husband and her daughter would die in October of AD 23 when the Xin dynasty was destroyed by a series of agrarian revolts.

== Notes ==
Chinese royalty
New dynasty	Empress of the Xin dynasty 9 – Jan 21	Succeeded by Empress Shi
Preceded by Empress Wang of Western Han dynasty	Empress of China; 9 – Jan 21	Succeeded by Empress Shi
