= Wang Mang =

Emperor of the Xin dynasty of China from 9 to 23

Wang Mang 王莽
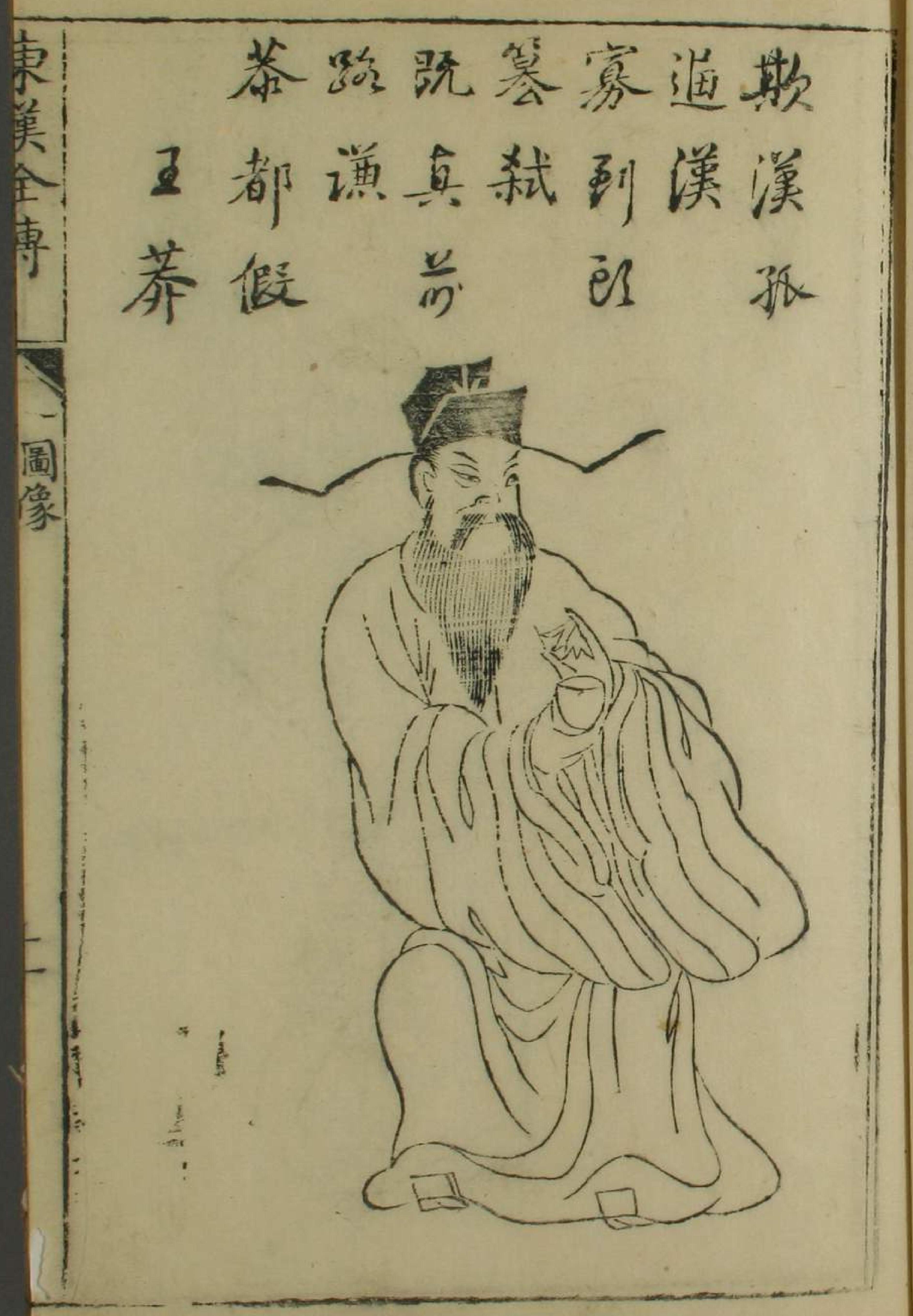

Emperor of the Xin dynasty
- Reign: AD 9–23
- Born: 45 BC; Yuancheng, Wei Commandery
- Died: 6 October AD 23 (aged 67); Chang'an
- Spouse: Empress Wang; Empress Shi
- Issue: Wang Yu (王宇); Wang Huo (王獲); Wang An, Prince of Xinqian (王安); Wang Lin, Prince of Tongyiyang (王臨); Wang Xing, Duke of Gongxiu (王興); Wang Kuang, Duke of Gongjian (王匡); Lady Wang, Empress Xiaoping of Han (孝平皇后); Wang Jie, Lady of Mudai (王捷); Lady Wang, Lady of Muxiu
Era dates
- Shijianguo 始建國 (9–13); Tianfeng 天鳳 (14–19); Dihuang 地皇 (20–23)
- House: Wang
- Dynasty: Xin
- Father: Wang Man (王曼)
- Mother: Qu (渠)

Wang Mang
- Chinese: 王莽
Transcriptions
Standard Mandarin
- Hanyu Pinyin: Wáng Mǎng
- Wade–Giles: Wang^{2} Mang^{3}
- IPA: [wǎŋ màŋ]
Yue: Cantonese
- Yale Romanization: Wòhng Móhng
- Jyutping: Wong4 Mong5
- IPA: [wɔŋ˩ mɔŋ˩˧]
Southern Min
- Tâi-lô: Ông Báng
Old Chinese
- Zhengzhang: ɢʷaŋ maːŋʔ

Courtesy name Wang Jujun
- Chinese: 王巨君
Transcriptions
Standard Mandarin
- Hanyu Pinyin: Wáng Jùjūn
- Wade–Giles: Wang Chü-chün

Title Shijianguo Emperor
- Traditional Chinese: 始建國天帝
- Simplified Chinese: 始建国天帝
- Literal meaning: Heavenly Emperor who Begins the Founding of the Nation
Transcriptions
Standard Mandarin
- Hanyu Pinyin: Shǐjiànguó Tiāndì
- Wade–Giles: Shih-chien-kuo T'ien-ti

Wang Mang (45 BC – 6 October AD 23), courtesy name Jujun, officially titled the Shijianguo Emperor, was the founder and the only emperor of the short-lived Xin dynasty of imperial China. (Note: Early Chinese dynasties were typically named after the fief of their founding dynast, and this reading is consistent with Wang Mang's pre-imperial position as Marquess of Xindu. In 1950, C.B. Sargent suggested that the name of the dynasty should be read as meaning 'new', which J.J.L. Duyvendak rejected out of hand. Chauncey S. Goodrich later argued that it may be possible to assign a semantic reading to Xin, but that it ought to be read as "renewed" or "renewal" and not simply "new".) Originally an official and consort kin of the Han dynasty, Wang seized the throne in AD 9. The Han dynasty was restored after his overthrow, and his rule marked the separation between the earlier Western Han dynasty and the later Eastern Han dynasty.

Traditional Chinese historiography viewed Wang as a tyrant and usurper, while more recently some historians have portrayed him as a visionary and selfless social reformer. During his reign, he abolished slavery and initiated a land redistribution program. A learned Confucian scholar who sought to implement the harmonious society he saw in the Chinese classics, his efforts ended in chaos. Wang Mang's late reign saw large-scale peasant rebellions, most notably the revolts of the Lülin and Red Eyebrows (Chimei). In October AD 23, the capital Chang'an was overrun and the imperial palaces sacked. Wang Mang was killed in the battle. The Han dynasty was re-established, the Gengshi Emperor taking the throne in the year 23 and the Guangwu Emperor taking the throne in the year 25 after defeating the Red Eyebrows who had deposed the Gengshi Emperor.

== Early life and career ==
Born in 45 BC, Wang Mang was a son of Wang Man (王曼), a younger brother of Empress Wang Zhengjun, and his wife Qu (渠, family name unknown). He claimed that his lineage can be traced back to the king Jian of Qi, whose descendants changed their surname to Wang ("King") as Qi locals referred to them as the "royal family". Wang Man died early when Wang Mang was still young, before Emperor Cheng took the throne and his mother Empress Wang became empress dowager. Unlike most of his brothers, Wang Mang did not have the opportunity to become a marquess. Empress Wang took pity on his family, and after she was widowed, she had Qu moved to the imperial palace to live with her.

While Wang Mang was well connected to the imperial family, he did not have the luxurious lifestyle that his cousins enjoyed. Unlike his relatives who lived luxuriously and competed with each other on who could spend more, Wang Mang was praised for his humility, thriftiness, and his desire to study. He wore not the clothes of young nobles but those of a young Confucian scholar. He was also praised on how filial he was to his mother and how caring he was to the wife and son of his deceased brother Wang Yong (王永). Wang Mang befriended many capable people and served his uncles conscientiously.

When Wang Mang's powerful uncle the commander of the armed forces Wang Feng (王鳳; 33–22 BC) grew ill, Wang Mang cared for him day and night and attended to his medical and personal needs. Wang Feng was touched and, before his death, he asked Empress Dowager Wang and Emperor Cheng to take good care of Wang Mang. Wang Mang was therefore given the post of imperial attendant (黃門郎) and later promoted to be one of the subcommanders of the imperial guards (射聲校尉).

In 16 BC, another of Wang Mang's uncles, Wang Shang (王商) the Marquess of Chengdu, submitted a petition to divide part of his march and make Wang Mang a marquess himself. Several well-regarded officials concurred in this request, and Emperor Cheng was impressed with Wang Mang's reputation. He therefore made Wang Mang the Marquess of Xindu and promoted him to the Chamberlain for Attendants (光祿大夫). It was described by historians that the greater the position that Wang was promoted to, the more humble he became. He did not accumulate wealth but used the money to support scholars and to give gifts to colleagues which gained him much praise.

Wang Mang had only a single wife, Lady Wang, and no concubines. However, as later events would show, Wang was not completely faithful to his wife, even at this time.

Emperor Cheng appointed his uncles, one after another, to be the commander of the armed forces (the most powerful court official), and speculation grew as to who would succeed Wang Mang's youngest surviving uncle, Wang Gen (王根, commander 12–8 BC). Wang Mang was considered one of the possibilities, while another was his cousin Chunyu Zhang (a son of Empress Dowager Wang's sister), who had a much closer personal relationship to Emperor Cheng than Wang Mang. Chunyu also had friendly relations with both Emperor Cheng's wife Empress Zhao Feiyan and his deposed former wife Empress Xu.

To overcome Chunyu's presumptive hold on succeeding Wang Gen, Wang Mang took action. He collected evidence that Chunyu, a frivolous man in his words and deeds, had secretly received bribes from the deposed Empress Xu, had promised to help her become "left empress", and had promised his associates important position once he succeeded Wang Gen. In 8 BC, he informed Wang Gen and Empress Dowager Wang of the evidence, and both Wang Gen and Empress Dowager Wang were greatly displeased with Chunyu. They exiled Chunyu back to his march. Chunyu, before he left the capital, gave his horses and luxurious carriages to his cousin Wang Rong (王融), the son of his uncle Wang Li (王立), with whom he had a running feud. Wang Li, happy with Chunyu's gift, submitted a petition requesting that Chunyu be allowed to remain at the capital. However, this request was treated with suspicion by Emperor Cheng because he knew of the feud between Wang Li and Chunyu. He ordered Wang Rong to be arrested, and Wang Li (knowing this) ordered his son to commit suicide in the middle of his panic. This dramatic action only made Emperor Cheng more suspicious. He therefore had Chunyu arrested and interrogated. Chunyu admitted to deceiving Empress Xu and receiving bribes from her, and he was executed.

On 16 November 8 BC, Wang Gen, by then seriously ill, submitted his resignation and requested that Wang Mang succeed him. On 28 November 8 BC, Emperor Cheng made Wang Mang the commander of the armed forces (大司馬) at the age of 37.

== First tenure as the commander of the armed forces ==
After Wang Mang was promoted to this position, effectively the highest in the imperial government, he became even better known for his self-discipline and promotion of capable individuals than before. As a result, the general perception of the Wang clan as arrogant, wasteful, and petty began to be reversed.

In 7 BC, Wang's cousin Emperor Cheng died suddenly, apparently from a stroke although some historians have suggested the possibility of an overdose of aphrodisiacs given to him by Consort Zhao Hede. Emperor Cheng's nephew the crown prince Liu Xin was the son of Emperor Cheng's brother, Liu Kang (劉康), Prince Kang of Dingtao. Liu Xin became emperor (posthumously remembered as Emperor Ai of Han). For the time being, Wang remained in his post and continued to be powerful in the imperial court, as his aunt became grand empress dowager and was influential. However, that position soon changed.

Emperor Ai's grandmother, Princess Dowager Fu of Dingtao, the former concubine of Grand Empress Dowager Wang's husband Emperor Yuan, was a domineering woman with a strong personality who was able to control her grandson and guide him as she pleased. She greatly wanted the title of empress dowager as well. Initially, Grand Empress Dowager Wang decreed that Princess Dowager Fu and Emperor Ai's mother, Consort Ding, see him every 10 days. However, Princess Dowager Fu soon began to visit her grandson every day, insisting on bestowal of titles: Empress Dowager for herself and titles of nobility for her relatives comparable to those of the Wangs. Grand Empress Dowager Wang, sympathetic to the difficult situation facing Emperor Ai, first granted Prince Kang the unusual title of "Emperor Gong of Dingtao" (定陶共皇) and then, under the rationale of that title, granted Princess Dowager Fu the title "Empress Dowager Gong of Dingtao" (定陶共皇太后) and Consort Ding the title "Empress Gong of Dingtao" (定陶共皇后). Several members of the Fu and Ding clans were created marquesses. Grand Empress Dowager Wang also ordered Wang Mang to resign and transfer power to the Fu and Ding relatives. Emperor Ai declined to agree to this request and begged Wang Mang to stay in his administration.

Several months later, however, Wang Mang came into direct confrontation with now Empress Dowager Fu. At a major imperial banquet, the official in charge of seating placed Empress Dowager Fu's seat next to Grand Empress Dowager Wang's. When Wang Mang saw this, he rebuked the official and ordered that Empress Dowager Fu's seat be moved to the side, which drew great ire from Empress Dowager Fu, who then refused to attend the banquet. To soothe her anger, Wang Mang resigned, and Emperor Ai approved his resignation. After this event, the Wangs gradually and inexorably lost their power.

== Retirement during Emperor Ai's reign ==
After Wang Mang's resignation, Emperor Ai initially requested him to remain in the capital Chang'an and periodically meet with him to give advice. However, in 5 BC, Empress Dowager Fu achieved success in her quest for titles. Emperor Ai removed the qualification "of Dingtao" from his father's posthumous title (thus making him simply "Emperor Gong") and then gave his grandmother a variation of the grand empress dowager title (帝太太后, ditai taihou), as opposed to Grand Empress Dowager Wang's title (太皇太后, taihuang taihou). His mother received a variation of the empress dowager title (帝太后, ditaihou), as opposed to Empress Dowager Zhao's title (皇太后, huangtaihou). The chancellor Zhu Bo (朱博) and vice-chancellor Zhao Xuan (趙玄), at Empress Dowager Fu's behest, submitted a petition to have Wang demoted to commoner status for having previously opposed Grand Empress Fu. Emperor Ai did not do so but sent Wang back to his march in Xindu (modern Nanyang, Henan).

While in Xindu, Wang was careful not to associate with many people to forestall false accusations that he was planning a rebellion. In 5 BC, when his son Wang Huo killed a household servant, Wang Mang ordered him to commit suicide. By 2 BC, there had been several hundred petitions by commoners and officials requesting Wang Mang's return to the capital. Emperor Ai, who also respected Wang Mang, summoned him and his cousin Wang Ren (王仁), the son of Wang Gen, back to the capital to assist Grand Empress Dowager Wang. However, Wang Mang was to have no official post and was to exert little influence on politics.

== Regency and building of a personality cult ==
Emperor Ai died suddenly in 1 BC, without an heir. Taking decisive action, Grand Empress Dowager Wang seized power back from Emperor Ai's male favourite and likely lover Dong Xian (Note: commander of the armed forces by this point) and summoned Wang Mang back to the imperial government. She put him in charge of the armed forces and the government. They summoned Prince Jizi of Zhongshan (the last surviving male issue of Grand Empress Dowager Wang's husband Emperor Yuan) to the capital to succeed Emperor Ai, and he ascended the throne as Emperor Ping. Wang Mang became his regent.

In 1 BC, Wang Mang, now back in power, took drastic action to attack actual or perceived political enemies:

- The relations of Emperor Ai, the Fus, and the Dings were demoted and exiled back to their ancestral lands.
- Empress Dowager Zhao Feiyan, the wife of Emperor Cheng, (Note: who was friendly with the late Grand Empress Dowager Fu) and Empress Fu, the wife of Emperor Ai, (Note: related to Grand Empress Dowager Fu) were demoted to commoner status and ordered to guard their husbands' tombs. They committed suicide in response.
- Grand Empress Dowager Fu and Empress Dowager Ding were posthumously demoted to the titles of "mother of Prince Gong of Dingtao" and "Consort Ding" respectively. (Note: In 5 CE, Wang disinterred Consorts Fu and Ding's caskets and stripped their bodies of jade burial shells. He then sent the bodies to Dingtao to be buried there. Their tombs were then completely flattened and surrounded with thorns.)
- Dong Xian—who had committed suicide soon after his demotion—was disinterred and reburied within a prison. His clan was exiled.
- He Wu (何武), the former chancellor, and his friend Gongsun Lu (公孫祿), who had opposed Wang Mang's regency, were relieved of their posts.
- Wujiang Long (毋將隆), the governor of the Nan Commandery in modern Hubei, who had rejected Wang Mang's advances to serve as a political ally, was charged with having falsely accused the innocent Princess Dowager Feng Yuan of Zhongshan of witchcraft in the year 6 even though he was not involved. Wujiang Long, along with the actual co-conspirators against Princess Dowager Feng, were exiled.

Wang Mang, having thus consolidated his power, began to further build up his personality cult, encouraging others to submit false prophecies in which he was mentioned as the second coming of Ji Dan, the Duke of Zhou and the regent for King Cheng of Zhou, or other great mythical personalities. He also began a regime of modifying the governmental structure to recall the governments of the Zhou dynasty and the even more ancient Shang dynasty. This included numerous changes to officials' titles and even to geographical locations. To prevent Emperor Ping's maternal Wei clan uncles from becoming powerful, he ordered that they, along with Emperor Ping's mother, Consort Wei, not be allowed to visit Emperor Ping in the capital.

In AD 1, after bribing the distant Yueshang tribes (Note: probably in modern southern Vietnam) to submit offerings of an albino pheasant, (Note: considered a rare sign of divine favour) Wang Mang was successful in having his followers persuade Grand Empress Dowager Wang to create him the Duke of Anhan (安漢公). This was highly unusual: The Han nobility system had not included dukes up to that point. This action gave Wang Mang a title parallel to that of the Duke of Zhou. Believing her nephew to be truly faithful, Grand Empress Dowager Wang transferred more of her authority to him.

In 2 CE, Wang Mang issued a list of regulations to the ally-vassal Xiongnu, which the Xiongnu chanyu Nangzhiyasi (囊知牙斯)—later shortened to Zhi at Wang Mang's request—obeyed, but Wang Mang's tone of treating Xiongnu as a subordinate state rather than an ally offended Nangzhiyasi, which would foreshadow the eventual breakdown of relationships with the Xiongnu. In the same year, Wang Mang decided to marry his daughter to Emperor Ping to further strengthen his position. Initially, he started a selection process of eligible noble young ladies after declaring, in accordance with ancient customs, that Emperor Ping would have one wife and 11 concubines. However, in an act of false modesty intended to create the opposite result, he then petitioned Grand Empress Dowager Wang that his daughter not be considered. Wang Mang then started a petition with the aim of having the Chinese people have his daughter selected as empress. The petitioners stormed the outside of the palace, and Grand Empress Dowager Wang, overwhelmed by the display of affection for Wang Mang, ordered that Wang Mang's daughter be made empress. In the year 4, Emperor Ping officially married her and made her empress.

Wang Mang's son Wang Yu (王宇) disagreed with his father's dictatorial regime and the program to build up his personality cult, afraid that in the future the Wangs would suffer a popular backlash once Emperor Ping was an adult. In response he formed friendships with Emperor Ping's Wei uncles, and told Consort Wei to offer assurances to Wang Mang that she would not act as Emperor Ai's mother and grandmother did, trying to become an empress dowager. Wang Mang still refused to let her visit the capital.

In the 3 CE, Wang Yu formed a conspiracy with his teacher, Wu Zhang (吳章), (Note: Wu Zhang was probably not related to Wu Han, who served as a general under Emperor Guangwu of Han.) his brother-in-law, Lü Kuan (呂寬), and the Weis, to try to break Wang Mang's dictatorial hold. They decided that they would create what appeared to be supernatural incidents to make Wang Mang concerned, and then have Wu Zhang try to persuade Wang Mang to transfer power to the Weis. Wang Yu instructed Lü Kuan to toss a bottle of blood onto Wang Mang's mansion door, but Lü was discovered by Wang Mang's guards. Wang Mang then arrested Wang Yu, who committed suicide, and his wife (Lü Kuan's sister) Lü Yan (呂焉), who was then executed. Wang Mang subsequently executed Wu Zhang and the entire Wei clan, except for Consort Wei. It is not known what happened to Lü Kuan, but it is unlikely he could have escaped death.

Wang Mang took this opportunity to wipe out other potential enemies. Wang Yu and Lü's co-conspirators were tortured with anyone who they mentioned being arrested and then either executed or forced to commit suicide. The victims of this purge included Emperor Yuan's sister, Princess Jingwu (敬武長公主), Wang Mang's uncle, Wang Li, and his cousin, Wang Ren. He falsely advised Grand Empress Dowager Wang that they had died of illnesses. Many other officials who were not willing to follow Wang Mang were victimized in this purge. After this, Wang Mang's hold on power became absolute. In the year 5, Wang Mang revived an ancient ceremony intended for those who had made great contributions to the state and had himself given the nine bestowments. These "nine bestowments" would, after Wang Mang, become a customary step for usurpers to receive before they usurped the throne.

Around AD 5, Emperor Ping appeared to grow out of the heart condition from which he had suffered as a child. It soon became clear that he resented Wang Mang for killing his uncles and not allowing his mother to visit him in Chang'an. Wang therefore resolved to murder the emperor. In the winter of the year 5, Wang submitted pepper wine (Note: considered in those days to be capable of chasing away evil spirits) to the 13-year-old emperor, but had the wine spiked with poison. As the emperor was suffering the effects of the poison, Wang wrote a secret petition to the gods, in which he offered to substitute his life for Emperor Ping's, and then had the petition locked away. (Note: Historians generally believed that Wang had two motives in doing this: firstly, in case Emperor Ping recovered from the poisoning, to use the petition to try to absolve himself of involvement in the poisoning and, secondly, to leave for posterity evidence of his faithfulness to the emperor.) After a few days of suffering, Emperor Ping died.

== As acting emperor ==
Because the young Emperor Ping didn't have any children with his wife Empress Wang or any of his concubines, there were no heir. Also, there were now no surviving male issue from Emperor Ping's grandfather, Emperor Yuan. Emperor Ping's great-grandfather's Emperor Xuan progeny were therefore examined for possible successors.

There were 53 great-grandsons of Emperor Xuan then still living but at the time and they were all adults. Wang Mang disliked the fact that they were all adults as he wanted a child whom he could control. Therefore, he declared that it was inappropriate for members of the same generation to succeed each other (even though Emperor Ping had succeeded his cousin Emperor Ai several years earlier). He then examined the 23 great-great-grandsons of Emperor Xuan—all of whom were infants or children.

While the examination process was proceeding, the mayor of South Chang'an submitted a rock with mysterious red writing on it. The message on the rock was "Wang Mang, the Duke of Anhan, should be emperor." In May, Wang had his political allies force Grand Empress Dowager Wang to issue an edict granting him the title of "Acting Emperor" (假皇帝), with a commission to rule as emperor until one of Emperor Xuan's great-great-grandson could be selected as the new Emperor. To further bolster his claims, Wang also created a false genealogy, declaring himself a descendant of the Yellow Emperor, a legendary emperor revered in Chinese culture.

In the spring of the year 6, acting Emperor Wang selected the child Ying, then just one year old, as the designated successor to Emperor Ping, claiming that soothsayers told him that Ying was the candidate most favoured by the gods. He gave Ying the epithet Ruzi, the same epithet that King Cheng of Zhou had when he was in his minority and under the regency of the Duke of Zhou. This was intended to support Wang Mang's claim that he was as faithful as the Duke of Zhou before him. However, Emperor Ruzi did not ascend the throne but was given the title of crown prince. Empress Wang was given the title empress dowager.

As acting emperor, Wang reinstituted the Zhou system of five grades of nobility—duke (公, gong), marquess (侯, hou), earl (伯, bo), viscount (子, zi), and baron (男, nan).

Several members of the imperial Liu clan were naturally suspicious of acting Emperor Wang's intentions. They started or were involved in several failed rebellions against Wang:

- In the year 6, Liu Chong (劉崇), the Marquess of Anzhong, launched an attack against Wan (宛, in modern Nanyang, Henan). His attack failed. It is not known what happened to him, other than that as a punishment, Wang had his house filled with dirty water.
- In the year 7, Zhai Yi (翟義), the governor of Dong Commandery and Liu Xin (劉信), the Marquess of Yanxiang (and the father of Liu Kuang (劉匡), the Prince of Dongping (modern Tai'an, Shandong)) started the largest rebellions of all. They were joined by agrarian rebellion leaders Zhao Peng (趙朋) and Huo Hong (霍鴻) from the area immediately west of the capital Chang'an. They declared Liu Xin emperor. Wang responded by sending messengers all around the nation to pledge that he would in fact pass on the throne to Emperor Ruzi once he was an adult. Wang's armies defeated Zhai and Liu's armies in the winter, and Zhai was captured and executed. Liu fled and was never captured. Zhao and Huo were also eventually defeated and executed.
- In the year 9 (after Wang Mang had usurped the imperial throne), Liu Kuai (劉快), the Marquess of Xuxiang, attacked the Duchy of Fuchong, of his brother Liu Ying (劉殷), the former Prince of Jiaodong. He was defeated and died while fleeing from the battle.

After Zhai and Liu Xin were defeated, Wang was satisfied that the empire was entirely under his control. So, he decided to finally seize the throne and start a new dynasty. In the winter of 8 CE, after receiving a false prophecy written by a criminal named Ai Zhang (哀章) which pretended to be a divine decree from Emperor Gaozu (Liu Bang) stating that the throne should be given to Wang, and that Grand Empress Dowager Wang should follow this divine will, Wang issued a decree accepting the position of emperor, establishing the Xin dynasty.

== Early reign ==
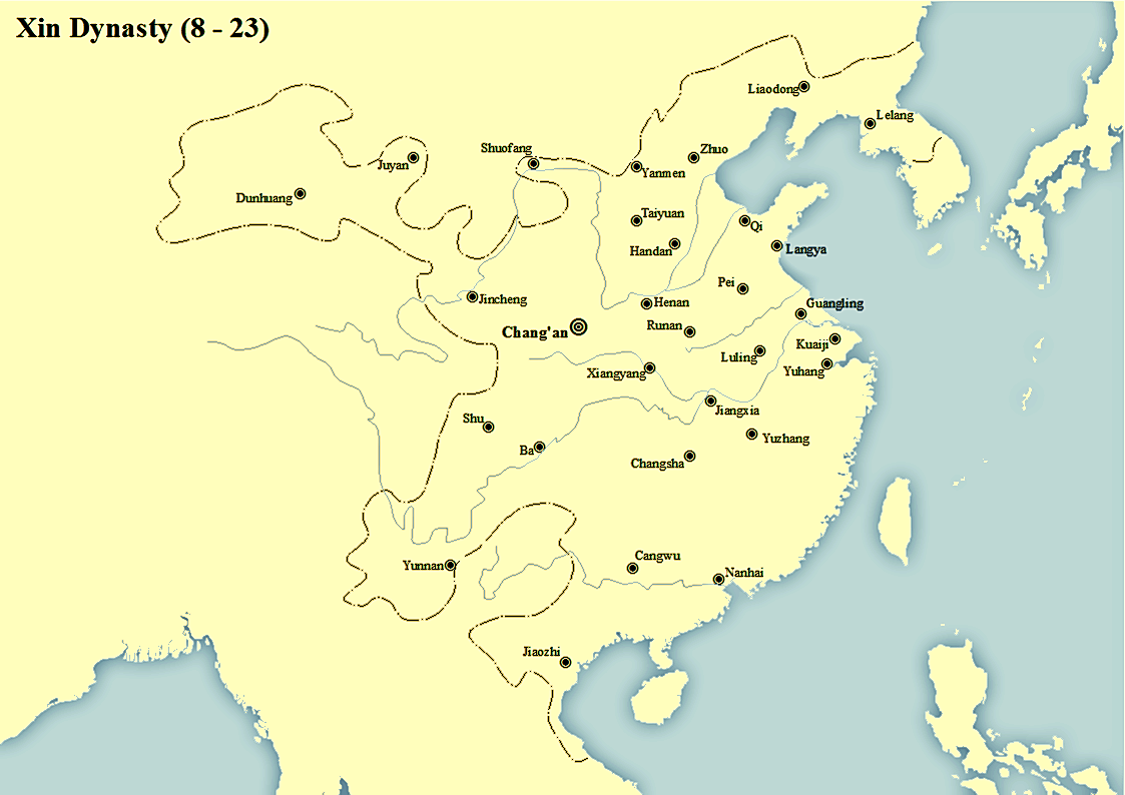
Territory of Xin dynasty

Early in his reign, Emperor Wang Mang confidently sought to implement his ideals of restoring the legendary golden age of the early Zhou dynasty as theorised in the Book of Rites. To that end, he modified the governmental structure to better conform with standards attributed to the Zhou. He also continued the regime of modifying geographical names to fit with ancient names (or more euphemistic names). This meant that even imperial edicts discussing the locations by their new names were forced to include notes on the old names so that the recipients of the edicts could tell what locations he was referring to. As part of this regime, the name of the capital was changed. Chang'an 長安; 'eternal peace' was redesignated Chang'an 常安; 'constant peace'. The characters are now homophones in Standard Mandarin but had distinct pronunciations at the time.

In AD 9, Wang Mang promoted his wife Lady Wang to the position of empress. By this point, only two of her four sons were still alive. The older Wang An (王安) was described as lacking in talent, so Wang Mang made the younger Wang Lin (王臨) crown prince, and made Wang An the Lord of Xinjia (新嘉辟). Wang Mang selected many Confucian scholars to serve as advisors for Crown Prince Lin.

Wang, grateful to his aunt Grand Empress Dowager Wang (who, however, resented him for deceiving her and usurping the throne), continued to honour her as empress dowager, but also gave her an additional title of Wangmu (王母), the same title carried by the mother of King Wen of Zhou, implying that she was also his mother and had helped establish a new dynasty. She died in the year 13.

=== Economic policies ===
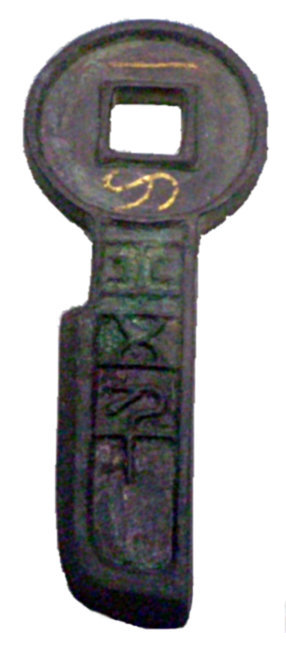
A knife coin issued by Wang Mang

In AD 9, Wang Mang instituted a revolutionary land redistribution system, ordering that all land in the empire legally become the empire's property, known as wangtian (王田, "Wang's fields" or "royal fields"), a system that bore similarity to the well-field system attributed to the Zhou dynasty. Any further real estate transactions were banned, although property owners were allowed to continue possessing their properties. If a household had less than eight members but had one "well" or larger property (about 0.6 km^{2} or 0.23 sq mi), then they were required to distribute the excess land to fellow clan members, neighbours, or other members of the same village. Criticism of the wangtian system was punishable by exile. The existing aristocracy were not too fond of having their land stripped from them, so they start bribing local officials to keep their lands, and local officials who were landlords themselves also started resisting the wangtian system. Some local officials took this opportunity to take free land from the people and redistribute it amongst their clan members. Farmers who were at first thrilled at the idea of getting free land but found that not only were they not getting free land – because Wang Mang didn't do anything to ensure that local officials were doing their jobs right – in addition to corrupt local officials who were taking the opportunity to take what little land they had left in the name of the law, both found themselves opposing the new system. Eventually, faced with resistance for both of these policies, Wang was forced to repeal both of them just three years later in the year 12.

Also in the year 9, Wang established the first income tax through a 10% tax of net earnings from wild herb and fruit collection, fishing, shepherding, and various nonagricultural activities and forms of trading. People were obligated to report their taxes to the government and officials would audit these reports. The penalty for evading this tax was one year of hard labor and confiscation of the entirety of a person's property. Previously, all Chinese taxes were either head taxes or property taxes, in addition to corvée labour. Because it caused popular discontent, this income tax was abolished in the year 22. Wang also instituted state monopolies on alcohol and weapons.

In the year 10, Wang set up a state economic adjustment agency, seeking to control fluctuations in the prices of food and textiles by purchasing excess goods and then selling them when the price went up. The same agency also became responsible for loaning money to entrepreneurs, at the rate of three percent per month. Six offices were set up: in Chang'an, Luoyang, Handan, Linzi (modern Zibo, Shandong), Wancheng (modern Nanyang, Henan), and Chengdu.

In the same year, Wang Mang instituted a "sloth tax": if landowners left their land uncultivated, city dwellers left their houses without trees, or citizens refused to work, they would pay penalties in the form of textile tributes. Those unable to pay the penalties would be required to perform work for the state. The new emperor had not accounted for people unable to find work, nor those living in mountainous areas with little work, already struggling to survive. Many old people who wanted to live a quiet life in the mountains were forced to move back in with their children to avoid taxation.

Another economic change instituted by Wang—which turned out to be disastrous—was to issue 28 types of coins: made of gold, silver, tortoise shells, cowrie shells, or copper. Because there were so many kinds of coins in comparison to the one kind that the Han used, people were unable to work out which coins were genuine or counterfeit, and the money-based economy came to a halt. Eventually, Wang was forced to abolish all but two kinds of coins: the small coin that had the same value of a Han coin, and the large coin that had the value of 50 small coins. However, despite fairly severe penalties, people lost faith in the Xin dynasty's currency and continued to secretly use old Han coins.

In the year 13, the Heavenly Stems were incorporated to number the years, replacing the previous system which used only the Earthly Branches.

In the year 17, in an attempt to refill the depleted imperial coffers, Wang instituted six monopolies: on alcohol, salt, iron, coinage, forestry, and fishing. However, because of rampant corruption, the imperial treasury received only limited benefit, while the people were greatly burdened. In the same year, Wang abolished slavery to limit the power of the landowning families. Anyone who offended the law, however, was punished by being turned a slave. Wang also did not account for the fact that because of the aforementioned "sloth tax" many people were obliged to sell themselves into slavery to earn money so they could help their families pay the tax. Following Wang's assassination in the year 23, slavery was reinstituted.

=== Deterioration of the relationship with Xiongnu and other vassals ===
==== Problems with Xiongnu ====
The first sign of irritation came sometime before AD 10 when the Xin director of Wuhuan affairs informed the Wuhuan tribes not to pay further tribute to Xiongnu. In response, Xiongnu carried out a punitive military raid against Wuhuan, capturing about 1,000 women and children to serve as hostages. Later, on Wang Mang's orders, the Xiongnu were forced to return the Wuhuan hostages.

Wang sent his ambassadors to the Xiongnu to inform Shanyu Zhi that Wang Mang had become emperor and that Xin had replaced Han. The ambassadors requested that the great seal of the shanyu, which Han had issued, be exchanged for a new seal issued by Xin. The old seal read, "the Great Seal of the Shanyu of Xiongnu" (匈奴單于璽; Xiongnu Chanyu Xi); the new seal read "the Seal of the Shanyu of Gongnu of Xin" (新恭奴善于章; Xin gong nu Shanyu zhang), changing the meanings "ferocious slave" (匈奴; Xiongnu) to "respectful slave" 恭奴; "Shanyu" 單于 (the chief of the tribes) to "Shanyu" 善于; and "seal" 璽 to "badge" 章, implying that the Xiongnu were nothing but a vassal of the Xin. This contrasted with the Han who had been somewhat ambiguous about whether the Xiongnu were a vassal group. Without examining the new seal, Shanyu Zhi agreed to the exchange. The ambassadors, apprehensive that the Shanyu – once he realized what had happened – would demand the old seal back, destroyed the old seal. Indeed, the next day, Shanyu Zhi realized that the seal's text had changed and requested that the old seal be returned. However, upon being informed that the old seal had been destroyed (which the ambassadors claimed falsely to be an act of the gods), he acquiesced. The Xiongnu leader nevertheless began to prepare for confrontation with Wang Mang's Xin. The Shanyu built defensive bulwarks some distance from the Xin outpost of Shuofang (朔方, modern Ordos, Inner Mongolia). He also began to accept Xiyu ("Western Regions", in modern Xinjiang and central Asia) kingdoms' pledges of allegiance, an action that had been banned by Wang.

Wang, irritated, declared war against Xiongnu. The strategy that he set out was to divide the Xin forces into 12 armies to divide and conquer Xiongnu. Under this scenario, Chanyu Zhi would be attacked and forced to retreat to the Dingling tribes (around Lake Baikal), and Xiongnu would be divided into 15 small kingdoms to be ruled by 15 descendants of Chanyu Huhanye, who had first established friendly relations with Han. Under this plan, 300,000 men would be gathered for the attack. However, Wang did not follow his generals' recommendations to start the campaign as soon as a critical mass of men were gathered but wanted to attack with overwhelming force. This placed pressure on the border regions as they strained to accommodate, over what turned about to be a lengthy period, the men who had arrived, while fruitlessly waiting for the full support of 300,000 to be gathered.

In the first stage of this plan, one of the local commanders kidnapped one of Chanyu Zhi's brothers, Xian (咸), the Prince of Zuoliwu (左犁汙王), and his sons Deng (登) and Zhu (助), by trickery. Xian and Zhu were made Chanyus, the first two of the planned 15. Chanyu Zhi became enraged and launched massive attacks against Xin border regions, causing the border regions much distress and economic and human loss. Eventually, Xian escaped back to Xiongnu, but his sons were kept as hostages. After Zhu died, Deng succeeded him. However, in the year 12, after hearing reports that Xian's other son Jiao (角) had been a successful Xiongnu strategist in military actions against the Xin, Wang, in anger, executed Deng and his attendants.

In the year 13, Chanyu Zhi died. The powerful official Xubu Dang (須卜當) and his wife Yun, the Princess Yimuo (the daughter of Chanyu Huhanye and Wang Zhaojun), who advocated peaceful relations with Xin and who were also friendly with Xian, supported Xian as the new Chanyu. Even though Xian was unaware that Wang Mang had executed his son Deng, relations between Xiongnu and Xin remained tense. There was a temporary détente in the year 14, when Xian returned Xin defectors Chen Liang (陳良) and Zhong Dai (終帶), who, as junior army officers in Xiyu, had killed their superiors and surrendered to Xiongnu (perhaps seeking to have Xiongnu help them re-establish Han) so that Wang could execute them. In response, Wang recalled the forces located in the northern regions which were intended to be used to attack Xiongnu (but were never given the full support that Wang envisioned). However, after Chanyu Xian found out late in the year 14 that Deng had been executed, he resumed raids against the border regions but maintained a façade of peace.

==== Problems with southwestern tribes ====
When Wang Mang first became emperor, his ambassadors visited the southwestern tribes (in modern Guizhou, Yunnan, and southwestern Sichuan), whose chieftains Han had largely granted the titles of princes. Wang's new seals demoted them to the titles of marquesses. One of the more powerful chieftains, Han (邯), the Prince of Juting (句町王), responded by angrily cutting off relations with Xin. Wang instructed the local commandery governor, Zhou Xin (周歆), to arrange for the killing of Han. In response, Han's brother Cheng (承) started a rebellion, killing Zhou, and starting a campaign of harassment against Xin borders. By AD 16, the Commandery of Yizhou (modern northeastern Yunnan) had become corrupt while Juting remained powerful. So Wang commissioned two generals, Lian Dan (廉丹) and Shi Xiong (史熊), to attack Juting. They were initially successful, but soon became caught in problems with food supply and disease. However, Wang continued to refuse to reinstitute the Han system of using awards to buy the submission of southwestern tribes.

==== Problems with Goguryeo ====
When Wang started his campaign against Xiongnu, he requisitioned the forces of Goguryeo within Xin borders. Goguryeo refused to cooperate and marched out of the Xin borders. The Xin army that Wang sent against them was defeated by them. The general Wang sent, Yan You (嚴尤), used humble words to trick their leader, Zou (騶), who was a marquess of Goguryeo, into a meeting with him where he treacherously killed Zou. Wang then changed Gaogouli to the derogatory term "Xiagouli" (gao means "high", while xia means "low"), and reduced their king's rank to marquess, which further enraged Goguryeo, causing them to attack the Xin northeastern regions with great ferocity.

==== Problems with Xiyu kingdoms ====
The troubles for Xin with the Xiyu kingdoms started in AD 10. In that year, Xuzhili (須置離), the King of Rear Cheshi (後車師, now part of Changji Hui Autonomous Prefecture) became concerned about the great cost of hosting Xin ambassadors and considered abandoning his kingdom and fleeing to Xiongnu. Xin's Xiyu commissioner Dan Qin (但欽) summoned Xuzhili and executed him. Xuzhili's brother Hulanzhi (狐蘭之) fled to Xiongnu and then attacked Dan, inflicting severe casualties, before withdrawing.

In the year 13, the dual kingdom of Wusun (which, under a system set up by Han, had two kings: the greater king was a descendant of a Han princess and her husband the king of Wusun, while the lesser king was a descendant of her brother-in-law) sent ambassadors to Chang'an to offer tributes. Because Wang Mang knew that the people of Wusun actually had greater affinity for the lesser king, he placed the ambassador of the lesser king in a higher position than the ambassador of the greater king, which greatly insulted the greater king.

In response, the Xiyu kingdoms joined forces and attacked the Xiyu commissioner Dan and managed to kill him. The Xiyu kingdoms then decided to no longer pledge allegiance to Xin. In the year 16, Wang made another attempt to intimidate the Xiyu kingdoms back into submission, but the Xin armies were divided and cut off from each other. One army was entirely wiped out. The other was forced to withdraw to Qiuzi (龜茲, in modern Aksu Prefecture, Xinjiang) with its way back to Xin proper cut off, and the army settled there and was unable to return for the rest of the Xin dynasty's duration.

=== Paralysis and corruption of the government ===
In addition to these wars, a major problem plaguing Wang Mang's administration was that Wang Mang was so committed to implementing the ancient governmental structure, believing that once things were restored to Zhou dynasty standards, the government would be efficient. He and his officials spent inordinate amounts of time carrying out research of legends, but leaving important affairs of the state undecided. A large number of counties lacked magistrates for years. The local officials, without supervision, became highly corrupt and oppressive towards the populace.

Because of the way Wang came to power, he also became suspicious of allowing his subordinates to have too much power. Therefore, he made all important decisions himself and did not delegate. This meant that many important decisions were delayed or never made. Further, he entrusted eunuchs to screen the reports from local governments for him, but those eunuchs would decide to relay or not relay those reports based on their own personal likes and dislikes, and many important petitions went unanswered.

An even more serious problem was that the officials lacked salaries. Han had a well-defined system of official salaries, but when Wang became emperor, he ordered that the salary system be overhauled and recalibrated. However, because a new system took years to be established, officials went without salaries in the meantime. In response, they became corrupt and demanded bribes from the people, causing much distress. In AD 16, Wang finally issued the new salary system, which was dependent on how prosperous the state was in determining what the salaries were. However, because the prosperity of the state was a highly subjective matter, officials continued to go without salaries for the rest of the Xin dynasty's existence.

== Middle reign ==
=== Agrarian rebellions ===
For a while, despite the failures of Wang's policies, the people were generally obedient, and his reign as Emperor looked to be on a firm footing. However, in AD 11, the Yellow River overflowed its banks, flooding much of the surrounding land in the process. The ensuing famine led to prophecies that Wang had lost the Mandate of Heaven and that the Han dynasty would be restored.

About AD 17, as the burdens from the wars and the corruption continued to increase and famines occurred (there was a major famine in Jing Prefecture, covering parts of modern Hubei, Hunan, and southern Henan), several agrarian rebellions started and took hold. The more significant rebellion and rebellion leaders included:

- Guatian Yi (瓜田儀), who occupied territory in modern Suzhou, Jiangsu.
- Mother Lü, whose son was a minor civil servant who was wrongly killed by the county magistrate. She gathered a group of desperate young men and killed the county magistrate, and then went out to the sea to become pirates, but later returned to land when her forces increased in size.
- Zhang Ba (張霸), who occupied territory in modern Jingzhou, Hubei.
- Yang Mu (羊牧), who occupied territory in modern Xiaogan, Hubei.
- Diao Zidu (刁子都), who roved through what is modern western Shandong and northern Jiangsu.
- The Lülin (綠林) rebels in modern Yichang, Hubei, who were led by Wang Kuang (王匡) and Wang Feng (王鳳, not to be confused with Wang Mang's uncle of the same name). Because both Wang Kuang and Wang Feng were from Xinshi (新市, in modern Jingmen, Hubei), these rebels were also known as Xinshi rebels.
- The Chimei (赤眉, "Red Eyebrow") rebels, who were led by Fan Chong (樊崇), who roved through large swaths of territory in modern southern Shandong and northern Jiangsu.

Wang Mang sent messengers issuing pardons with the aim of encouraging these rebels to disband. Once the messengers returned to Chang'an, some honestly reported that the rebels had gathered because the harsh laws made it impossible for them to make a living and therefore they were forced to rebel. Some, in order to flatter Wang Mang, told him that these were simply evil troublemakers who needed to be killed or that this was a temporary phenomenon. Wang listened to those who flattered him and generally relieved from their posts those who told the truth. Further, Wang made no further attempts to pacify the rebels, but instead decided to suppress them by force.

=== Problems with Xiongnu relations ===
Around this time, Wang made another strategic mistake involving Xiongnu. In AD 18, Chanyu Xian died, and his brother Yu (輿) became chanyu. He wanted to consider peace with Xin, and he sent one of his key officials and a nephew of his to serve as ambassadors to Chang'an. In response, Wang Mang sent Wang Zhaojun's brother, Wang She (王歙), to meet with Princess Yun and her husband, Xuyu Dang. At the meeting, however, Xin forces surprised and kidnapped the princess and her husband and took them to Chang'an. Wang Mang created Xuyu chanyu and envisioned placing him on the Xiongnu throne by force. This ended any hope of peace with Xiongnu.

=== Change of heir ===
In AD 20, Wang Mang made a sudden change to his presumed heir. He deposed Crown Prince Lin based on the rationale that trouble would come from the fact that Crown Prince Lin was younger than his brother Lord An, and thus Lin should not have been crown prince in the first place. He then created Lord An the Prince of Xinqian and Wang Lin the Prince of Tongyiyang.

In the year 21, Empress Wang died. After her death, Wang Mang discovered that one of Empress Wang's ladies in waiting, Yuan Bi (原碧), with whom he had an affair, had also had an affair with Crown Prince Lin, and that she had conspired with Crown Prince Lin to kill Wang Mang, because of Wang Lin's demotion. Wang Mang ordered Wang Lin to commit suicide by poison, but Wang Lin refused, and killed himself using a sword. Later that year, Wang An died as well. Wang Mang then announced that he had in fact two sons by female servants, whom he then created dukes.

== Late reign ==
=== Agrarian revolts ===
In AD 22, Wang Mang finally realised (as many of his officials had been trying to tell him) that the agrarian rebellions were posing a much greater threat to his rule than the Xiongnu. He commissioned two of his key officials, Wang Kuang (王匡, not to be confused with the Lülin leader of the same name) and Lian Dan to launch attacks against the agrarian rebellions, with the Chimei being their first target. Wang and Lian had some initial successes, but Wang insisted on having them keep fighting without resting, and the fatigued forces eventually collapsed.

In the same year, the Lülin forces suffered the effects of a major plague which killed about half of the rebels. This caused them to divide. One branch headed west to the region of modern Jingzhou, Hubei, while the other headed north to the region of modern Nanyang, Henan.

=== Liu's revolt merges with Lülin agrarian revolt ===
Around this time, the most ambitious of the rebels emerged. Liu Yan, a descendant of a distant branch of the Han imperial clan, who lived in his ancestral territory of Chongling (舂陵, in modern Xiangyang, Hubei), had long been disgusted by Wang Mang's usurpation of the Han throne, and had long aspired to start a rebellion. His brother Liu Xiu, by contrast, was a careful and deliberate man, who was content to be a farmer. Around this time, there were prophecies being spread in the community that the Lius would return to power, and many men gathered about Liu Yan, requesting that he lead them. He agreed and joined forces with the branch of the Lülin forces which were in the same area. Together they began to capture territory rather than just simply roving and raiding. In AD 23, under Liu Yan's leadership, the joint forces had a major victory over Zhen Fu (甄阜), the governor of Nanyang Commandery, killing him. They then besieged the important city of Wan (the capital of Nanyang).

=== A new imperial pretender ===
By this point, many other rebel leaders had become jealous of Liu Yan's capabilities and, while a good number of their men admired Liu Yan and wanted him to become the emperor of a newly declared Han dynasty, some of the rebel leaders had other ideas. They found another local rebel leader, also of Han imperial descent, Liu Xuan, who was considered a weak personality, and requested that he be made emperor. Liu Yan initially opposed this move and instead suggested that Liu Xuan carry the title "Prince of Han" first (echoing the founder of the Han dynasty, Liu Bang). The other rebel leaders refused and, in early 23, Liu Xuan was proclaimed the Gengshi Emperor. Liu Yan became prime minister.

=== The Battle of Kunyang ===
In the spring of AD 23, a major military confrontation sealed Wang Mang's fate.

He sent his cousin Wang Yi (王邑) and his prime minister, Wang Xun (王尋), with what he considered to be overwhelming force, some 430,000 men, intending to crush the newly reconstituted Han regime. The Han forces were at this point in two groups. One group was led by Wang Feng, Wang Chang (王常), and Liu Xiu, which, in response to the arrival of the Xin forces, withdrew to the small town of Kunyang (昆陽, in modern Pingdingshan, Henan). The other group was led by Liu Yan, which was besieging Wancheng. The rebels in Kunyang initially wanted to scatter, but Liu Xiu opposed that strategy. Rather, he advocated that they guard Kunyang securely, while he would bring together all other available troops from the surrounding areas and attack the Xin forces. After initially rejecting Liu Xiu's idea, the Kunyang rebels eventually agreed.

Liu Xiu carried out his action, and when he returned to Kunyang, he began harassing the besieging Xin forces from the outside. Wang Yi and Wang Xun led 10,000 men to attack Liu Xiu and ordered the rest of their troops not to move from their siege locations. Once they engaged in battle, however, after minor losses, the other units were hesitant to assist them, and Liu Xiu killed Wang Xun in battle. After that, the Han forces inside Kunyang burst out of the city and attacked the other Xin units leading to the much larger Xin forces suffering a total collapse. Many of the Xin soldiers deserted and headed to their homes. Wang Yi had to withdraw with only several thousand men back to Luoyang. This was a major blow to Xin and marked the beginning of the end for the Xin dynasty.

=== Conquest of the capitals ===
The Gengshi Emperor then established two armies, one led by Wang Kuang, which targeted Luoyang, and the other led by Shentu Jian (申屠建) and Li Song (李松), which targeted Chang'an. Many of the people along the way gathered, welcoming and then joining the Han forces. Shentu and Li quickly reached the outskirts of Chang'an. The rebels sacked the capital on 4 October 23. In response, the young men within Chang'an also rose up and stormed Weiyang Palace, the main imperial palace. Wang died during the battle at the palace at the hands of Du Wu (杜吳). His daughter Princess Huanghuang, the former empress of Han, was also killed. After Wang died, the crowd fought over the right to have the credit for having killed him, and dozens of soldiers died in the ensuing fight. Wang's body was cut into pieces, and his head was delivered to the provisional Han capital Wancheng to be hung on the city wall. However, the angry people took it off the wall and kicked it around and someone cut his tongue off and ate it. Eventually, the head was preserved and kept in a court vault, until it was destroyed in a fire during the Jin dynasty.

== Personal information ==
Parents

- Father: Wang Man (王曼), the early-deceased brother of Empress Wang Zhengjun, second son of Wang Jin, Marquess of Yangping and his wife Li Qin
- Mother: Lady Qu (渠氏)

Consort and issue(s):

- Empress Xiaomu, of the Wang clan (孝睦皇后 王氏, d. 21)
  - Wang Yu (王宇, d. AD 3), 1st son
  - Wang Huo (王獲, d. 2 BC), 2nd son
  - Wang An, Prince of Xinqian (新迁王 王安, d. AD 21), 3rd son
  - Wang Lin, Prince of Tongyiyang (统义阳王 王臨, d. AD 21), 4th son
  - Princess Huanghuang (黃皇室主, 8 BC – AD 23), 1st daughter
    - Married Emperor Ping of Han (9 BC – 3 February AD 6)
- Empress Shi, of the Shi clan (皇后史氏; created AD 23)
- Concubine Zengzhi (侍妾增秩), originally a female servant, family name unknown
  - Wang Kuang, Duke of Gongjian (功脩公王匡), 6th son
  - Lady of Muxiu (睦脩任), personal name Ye (曄), 2nd daughter
- Concubine Huaineng (侍妾懷能), originally a female servant, family name unknown
  - Wang Xing, Duke of Gongxiu (功脩公 王興), 5th son
- Concubine Kaiming (侍妾開明), originally a female servant, family name unknown
  - Lady of Mudai (睦逮任), personal name Jie (捷), 3rd daughter
- Consort Yuanbi (侍妾原碧), originally a female servant, family name unknown

Xin dynasty sovereigns
Personal name	Period of reign	Eras
Wang Mang	9–23	Shijianguo (始建國, Shǐjiànguó, "Beginning of Establishing the Nation") 9–13; Tianfeng (天鳳, Tiānfèng, "Heavenly Phoenix") 14–19; Dihuang (地皇, Dìhuáng, "Earthly Emperor") 20–23

== Wang Mang in popular culture ==
- Wang Mang is a character in the 2011 historical fantasy novel The Ghosts of Watt O'Hugh, in which he is treated admiringly and heroically. He was "the one for whom we'd been waiting," one character says of Wang Mang, after his death, "the one for whom we still wait."
- Wang Mang is one of the main characters of the Chinese television series Love Weaves Through a Millennium, in which he is played by Chen Xiang.

== Notes ==
Emperor of the Xin dynasty House of Wang Born: 45 BC Died: 6 October AD 23
Regnal titles
Preceded by Emperor Ruzi of Han	Emperor of China; Xin dynasty AD 9–23	Succeeded by Gengshi Emperor
