= Emperor Ping of Han =

Emperor of the Han dynasty from 1 BC to AD 6

Emperor Ping of Han 漢平帝
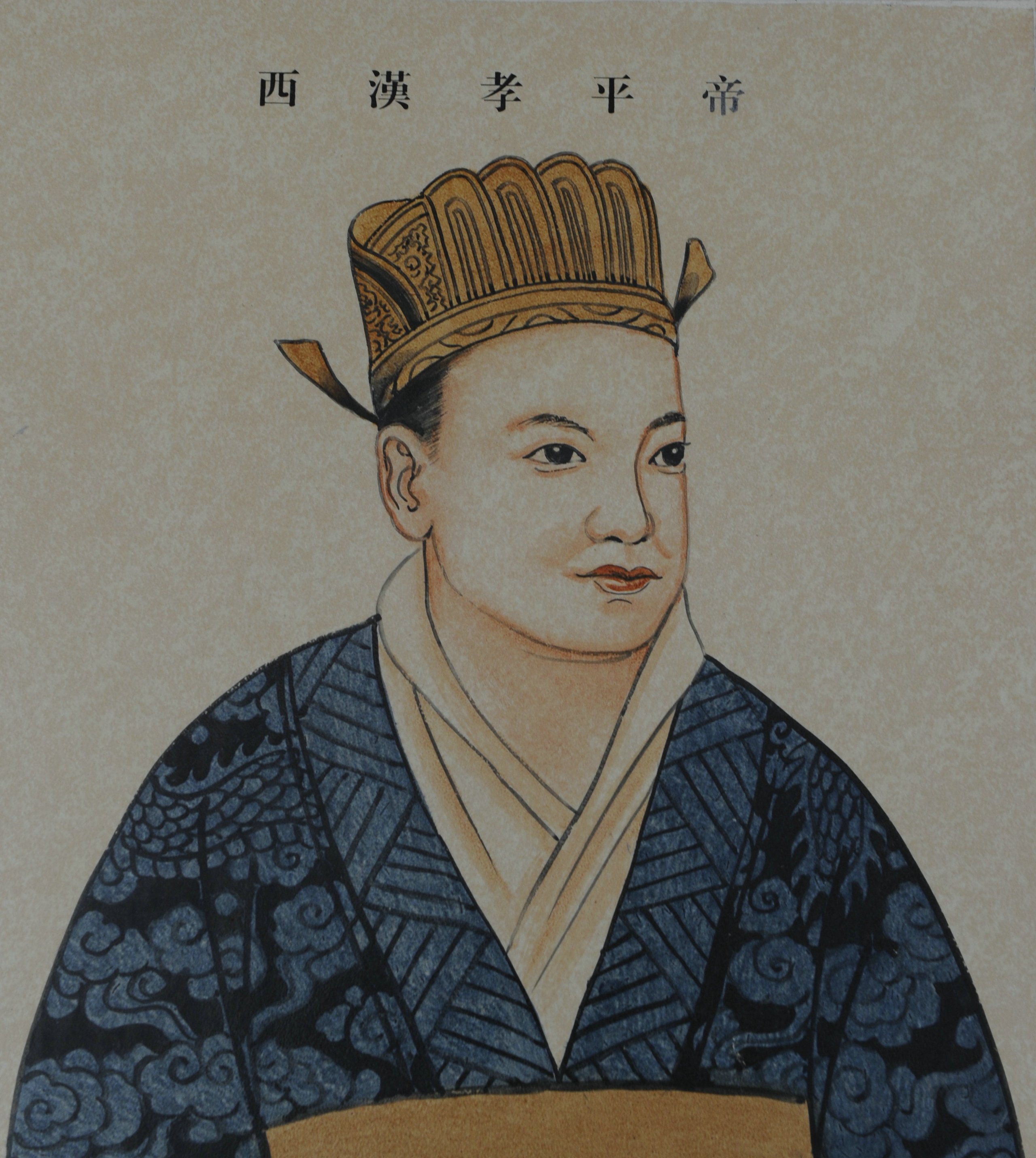
- Portrait of Emperor Ping

Emperor of the Han dynasty
- Reign: 17 October 1 BC – 3 February 6 AD
- Predecessor: Emperor Ai
- Successor: Liu Ying
- Born: 9 BC; Lunu, Principality of Zhongshan, Han dynasty
- Died: 3 February 6 AD (aged 14); Chang'an, Han dynasty
- Burial: Kang Mausoleum (康陵)
- Consorts: Empress Xiaoping
Names
- Liu Jizi 劉箕子, later Liu Kan 劉衎
Era dates
- Yuanshi (元始; 1–5 AD)
Posthumous name
- Emperor Xiaoping (孝平皇帝) "filial and peaceful"
Temple name
- Yuanzong (元宗) (later revoked)
- House: Liu
- Dynasty: Han (Western Han)
- Father: Liu Xing
- Mother: Lady Wei

Emperor Ping of Han (9 BC – 3 February 6 AD), personal names Liu Jizi and later Liu Kan, was the 14th emperor of the Chinese Han dynasty, reigning from 1 BC to AD 6. He ascended the throne at the age of eight following the death of his cousin, the childless Emperor Ai. Wang Mang was appointed regent by Grand Empress Dowager Wang Zhengjun. Dissatisfied with his father's dictatorial regency, in AD 3, Wang's son Wang Yu (王宇) conspired with Emperor Ping's maternal uncles of the Wei clan against the regent, but after they were discovered, Wang Mang had not only Wang Yu and the Weis (except Consort Wei) put to death, but also used this opportunity to accuse many actual or potential political enemies as being part of the conspiracy and to execute or exile them. From then onwards, the Han dynasty existed only in name. Furthermore, Wang Mang also designated his daughter as the empress consort to Emperor Ping to codify his legitimacy to power. Emperor Ping was allegedly poisoned by Wang Mang after reigning less than six years because Wang was concerned that he would avenge his uncles, and his successor, the infant Ruzi Ying, would be chosen by none other than Wang Mang himself.

== Early life ==
Liu Jizi was born in 9 BC. His father Liu Xing (劉興) was the youngest son of Emperor Yuan (r.48-33 BC) and a younger brother of Emperor Cheng (r.33-7 BC). His mother was one of Prince Xing's consorts, Consort Wei (衛姬). Prince Jizi had three sisters (whose names are not recorded in history) but no brother. He was born with a heart ailment, which, when afflicting him, causes him to have circulation problems, manifesting itself outwardly as having his lips and appendages turn blue. He was raised by his paternal grandmother Consort Feng Yuan, a concubine of Emperor Yuan, who then had the title princess dowager in Prince Xing's principality.

Around the time of Prince Jizi's birth, Prince Xing was considered a potential imperial heir, because Emperor Cheng had no heirs, but eventually Emperor Cheng chose his nephew (Prince Jizi's cousin) Liu Xin (劉欣), because Emperor Cheng considered Prince Xin to be more capable than Prince Xing, and also wanted to adopt Prince Xin and make him his own son. When Emperor Cheng died in April 7 BC, Prince Xin took the throne as Emperor Ai.

Also in 7 BC, when Prince Jizi was just 2, Prince Xing died, and Prince Jizi inherited his principality as the Prince of Zhongshan (roughly modern Baoding, Hebei). He continued to be periodically afflicted with his heart disorder. As a result, his grandmother Princess Dowager Feng hired many physicians and often prayed to the gods. In 6 BC, Emperor Ai, hearing about his cousin's illness, sent imperial physicians along with his attendant Zhang You (張由) to go to Zhongshan to treat Prince Jizi. This, however, would have dire consequences of Princess Dowager Feng.

The imperial attendant Zhang was himself afflicted with a psychiatric condition (probably bipolar disorder), and when he got to Zhongshan, he suddenly, in a rage, left there and returned to the capital Chang'an. Once he did and was ordered to explain his conduct, he made up a false reason—that he had discovered that Princess Dowager Feng was using witchcraft to curse Emperor Ai and his grandmother, Empress Dowager Fu. Empress Dowager Fu and Princess Dowager Feng had been romantic rivals when they had been both consorts to Emperor Yuan, and Empress Dowager Fu decided to use this opportunity to strike at Princess Dowager Feng. She sent a eunuch, Shi Li (史立), to serve as investigator, and Shi tortured a good number of Princess Dowager Feng's relations—including her sister Feng Xi (馮習) and her sister-in-law Junzhi (君之)—some to death, but still could not build a solid case against Princess Dowager Feng. Shi Li decided to show Princess Dowager Feng who was actually behind the investigation, by referring to an incident in which then-Consort Feng defended Emperor Yuan against a bear which had broken loose. Princess Dowager Feng, realizing that Empress Dowager Fu was behind the investigation, went back to her palace and committed suicide. In total, 17 members of the Feng clan died as a result of the investigations. Prince Jizi, then still a toddler, was spared. Princess Dowager Feng's reputation would be restored, and her accusers severely punished, in 1 BC, after the deaths of Emperor Ai and Empress Dowager Fu.

In August 1 BC, Emperor Ai died without an heir. His stepgrandmother, Grand Empress Dowager Wang, quickly seized power back from Emperor Ai's male favorite (and probable lover) Dong Xian, and recalled her nephew Wang Mang as regent. Wang Mang quickly carried out a wave of retaliation against Dong Xian and Emperor Ai's Fu and Ding (relatives of his mother Consort Ding) relations, purging them from government. At the same time, he also purged many actual or potential political enemies, while pretending to Grand Empress Dowager Wang to be still loyal to the Han dynasty. Prince Jizi, as the only surviving male descendant of Emperor Yuan (both Emperors Cheng and Ai having died without issue), was considered the logical successor, and he was welcomed to Chang'an to succeed his cousin.

== Early reign and Wang Mang's aggrandization of power ==
Almost immediately after Emperor Ping took the throne, Wang Mang began to carry out a regime to return governmental structure to ancient days of the Zhou dynasty and the even more ancient Xia dynasty and Shang dynasty. He also aggressively pursued a program to build up a personality cult about himself, wanting to have himself recognized as a holy regent on the scale of the Duke of Zhou. In AD 1, for example, after having his political allies convincing Grand Empress Dowager Wang of his great faithfulness and great achievements, he was created the Duke of Anhan (安漢公, literally "Duke who made Han secure"), even though there had not been a single duke created in Han history up to that point. Further, to appease both the disaffected nobility and the people, Wang Mang instituted a program to restore marquess titles to descendants of past imperial princes and marquesses, started a pension system for retired officials, and reduced taxes. He also bribed vassal states into making offerings of rare animals, viewed as signs of heavenly blessing, to Han. With all people praising Wang Mang, he managed to persuade Grand Empress Dowager Wang, then already 69 years old, to have him make the important state decisions, rather than have her do so, and Wang Mang immediately became the most powerful figure in the empire.

To prevent Emperor Ping's Wei relations from becoming powerful potential rivals at court, Wang Mang limited the titles of Emperor Ping's uncles to acting marquesses (關內侯) and his mother Consort Wei to "Princess Xiao of Zhongshan" (Note: "Prince Xiao" being Prince Xing's posthumous name), and only created Emperor Ping's three sisters ladies (君). He also ordered that the Weis, including Consort Wei, and Emperor Ping's sisters not to be allowed to go to Chang'an to see him, but were to remain in Zhongshan.

In the year 2, to reduce the burden of the people in naming taboo, Emperor Ping's name was changed to Kan (衎), since Ji and Zi were commonly used characters.

Also in AD 2, Wang Mang decided to have his daughter married to Emperor Ping to further affirm his position. Initially, he started a selection process of eligible noble young ladies (Note: after declaring, in accordance with ancient customs, that Emperor Ping would have one wife and 11 concubines). However, then, in an act of false modesty intended to create the opposite result, he petitioned Grand Empress Dowager Wang that his daughter not be considered—and then started a petition drive by the people to have his daughter be selected as empress. The petitioners stormed the outside of the palace, and Grand Empress Dowager Wang, overwhelmed by the display of affection for Wang Mang, ordered that Wang Mang's daughter be made empress.

== The Lü Kuan Incident and Wang Mang's seizure of absolute power ==
Wang Mang's son Wang Yu (王宇) disagreed with his father's dictatorial regime and program to build up his personality cult, afraid that in the future the Wangs would receive a backlash when Emperor Ping was grown. He therefore formed friendships with Emperor Ping's Wei uncles, and told Consort Wei to offer assurances to Wang Mang that she would not act as Emperor Ai's mother and grandmother did, trying to become an empress dowager. Wang Mang still refused to let her visit the capital.

In the year 3, Wang Yu formed a conspiracy with his teacher Wu Zhang (吳章), his brother-in-law Lü Kuan (呂寬), and the Weis, to try to see what they can do to break Wang Mang's dictatorial hold. They decided that they would create what appear to be supernatural incidents to make Wang Mang concerned, and then have Wu try to persuade Wang Mang to transfer power to the Weis. Wang Yu told Lü to toss a bottle of blood onto Wang Mang's mansion door to create that effect—but Lü was discovered by Wang Mang's guards. Wang Mang then arrested Wang Yu, who then committed suicide, and his wife (Note: Lü Kuan's sister) Lü Yan (呂焉) was executed. Wang Mang then executed the entire Wei clan, except for Consort Wei. Wu was cut in half and then drawn and quartered. (It is not known what happened to Lü, but it would appear that there would be no way for him to escape death.)

Wang Mang then took this opportunity to further wipe out potential enemies—by torturing Wang Yu and Lü's coconspirators and then arrest anyone that they mentioned, and then have them either executed or forced them to commit suicide. The victims of this purge included Emperor Yuan's sister Grand Princess Jingwu (敬武長公主), Wang Mang's own uncle Wang Li (王立), and his own cousin Wang Ren (王仁). He told Grand Empress Dowager Wang, however, falsely, that they had died of illnesses. Many other officials who were not willing to follow Wang Mang were also victimized in this purge. After this, Wang Mang's hold on power became absolute.

In AD 4, Emperor Ping officially married Wang Mang's daughter and created her empress.

In the year 5, Wang Mang revived an ancient ceremony intended for those who have made great contributions to the state, and had himself given the nine bestowments. (The "nine bestowments" would, after Wang Mang, thereafter become a customary step for usurpers to receive before they usurp the throne.)

== Death ==
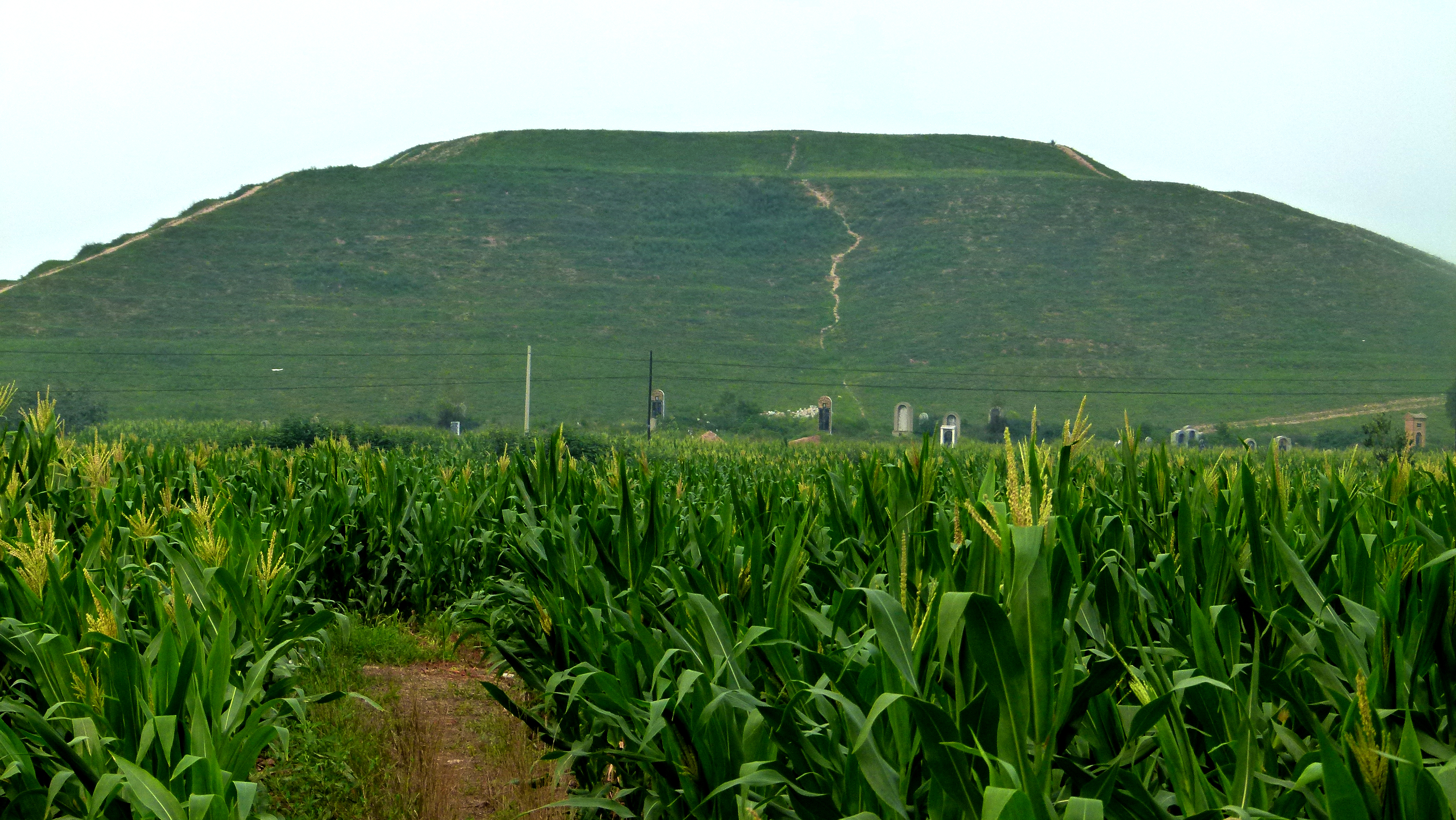
Kangling (康陵), tomb of Emperor Ping, in Xianyang, Shaanxi

Circa AD 5, Emperor Ping, having grown older, appeared to have grown out of his earlier heart condition, and it became fairly plain that he resented Wang Mang for slaughtering his uncles and not allowing his mother to visit him in Chang'an. Wang Mang therefore resolved to murder the emperor. In the winter, Wang Mang submitted pepper wine (Note: considered in those days to be capable of chasing away evil spirits and usual for celebrations of the Little New Year) to the 13-year-old emperor, but had the wine spiked with poison. As the emperor was suffering the effects of the poison, Wang Mang wrote a secret petition to the gods, in which he offered to substitute his life for Emperor Ping's, and then had the petition locked away. (Note: Historians generally believed that Wang Mang had two motives in doing this—one was, in case Emperor Ping recovered from the poisoning, to use this to try to absolve himself of involvement in the poisoning, and the second was to leave for posterity evidence of his faithfulness.) After a few days of suffering, Emperor Ping died. The throne would lie vacant for the next few years, as although Emperor Ping's cousin-once-removed, the infant Ruzi Ying, would be selected as emperor, he would never actually take the throne. Wang Mang would serve as acting emperor and usurp the Han throne officially in AD 8.

=== Tomb ===
Emperor Ping's burial mound is found in Zhouling district of Xianyang. The grave sits in a field with only a rudimentary sign and low fence to distinguish it. The latter has not proven effective in discouraging climbers, as there are worn paths leading up and down the hill.

== Era name ==
- Yuanshi (元始): AD 1–5

== Consorts ==
- Empress Xiaoping, of the Wang clan (孝平皇后 王氏; 4 BC – AD 23)

== See also ==
- Family tree of the Han dynasty

== Notes ==
Emperor Ping of Han House of Liu Born: 9 BC Died: 3 February 6
Regnal titles
Preceded by Emperor Ai of Han	Emperor of China; Western Han; 1 BC – 3 Feb 6 AD with Wang Mang (1 BC – 5 AD)	Succeeded by Ruzi Ying
