= Xin dynasty =

Chinese imperial dynasty from 9 to 23 AD

Xin 新
- 9–23 AD
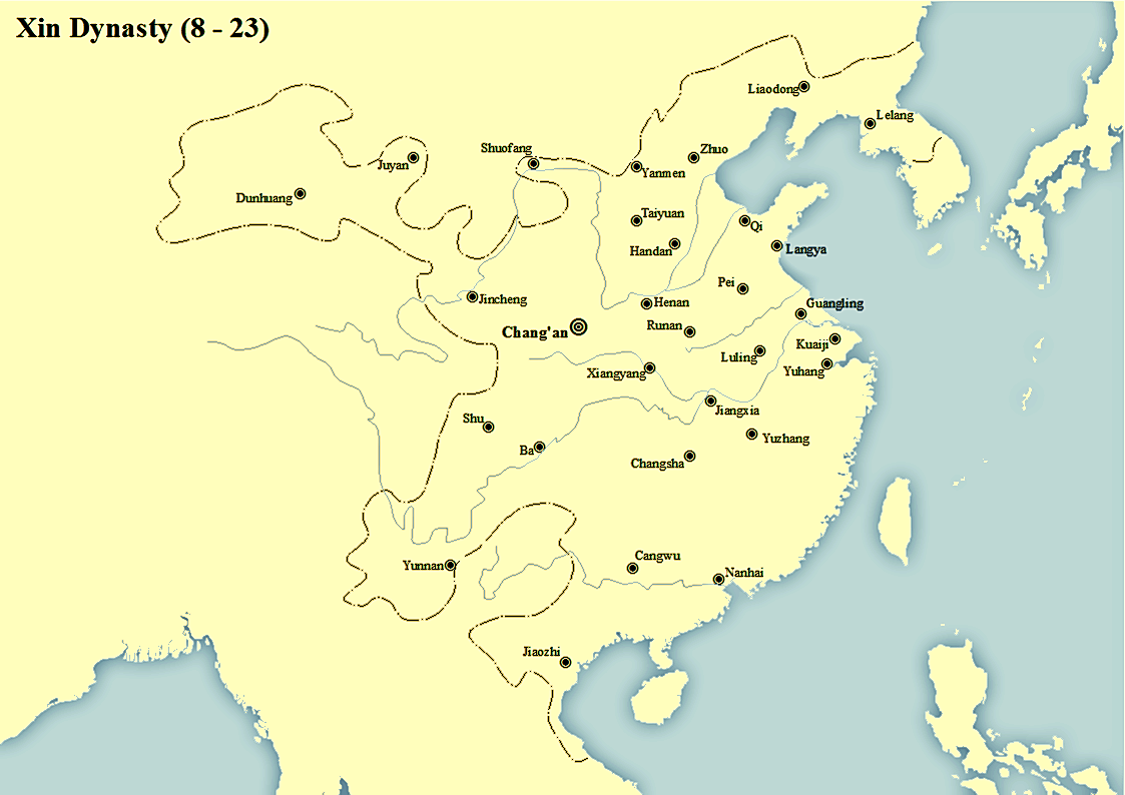
- Xin dynasty
- Capital: Chang'an
- Government: Monarchy
- Emperor
  - 9–23: Wang Mang
- History
  - Wang Mang proclaimed emperor: 10 January 9
  - Chang'an captured: 5 October 23 AD
- Currency: Chinese coin, gold, silver, tortoise shell, seashell (see Xin dynasty coinage)
Preceded by	Succeeded by
Western Han	Eastern Han; Chengjia

The Xin dynasty (/ʃɪn/; Chinese: 新朝; pinyin: Xīn Cháo), also known as Xin Mang (新莽) in Chinese historiography, was a short-lived Chinese imperial dynasty which lasted from 9 to 23 AD, established by the Han dynasty consort kin Wang Mang, who usurped the throne of the Emperor Ping of Han and the infant "crown prince" Liu Ying. The Xin dynasty ruled for over a decade before it was overthrown by rebels. After Wang's death, the Han dynasty was restored by Liu Xiu, a distant descendant of the Emperor Jing of Han; therefore, the Xin dynasty is often considered an interregnum of the Han, dividing it into the Western Han and the Eastern Han.

== Etymology ==
Chinese dynasties were typically named after the fief of their founders, and this reading is consistent with Wang Mang's pre-imperial position as Marquess of Xin. In 1950, C. B. Sargent suggested that the name of the dynasty should be read as meaning "new", which J. J. L. Duyvendak rejected out of hand. Chauncey S. Goodrich argued that it would be possible to assign a semantic reading to xin, but that it ought to be read as renewed or renewal, not simply new.

== History ==
After the death of Emperor Wu of Han, the ruling Liu family was increasingly beset by factional struggles. As result, the power of the imperial clan declined. In contrast, the Wang family grew powerful during the rule of Emperor Cheng of Han, and its leading member Wang Mang used his influence to act as regent for several young puppet emperors.

In contrast to other Wang family members who were content to rule the empire by influencing the Han emperors, Wang Mang had greater ambitions. He embarked on a programme of building and learning, creating much positive publicity and propaganda for himself. He openly presented himself as champion of Confucian virtues, and as guiding force of the empire. Following the death of Emperor Ping of Han in 6 AD, Wang Mang cemented his control over the empire. Rebellions against his de facto rule were crushed in 6 and 7 AD. Two years later, Wang usurped the throne and officially proclaimed the Xin (literally the "New dynasty").

Though he enjoyed no great support among the empire's political class, Wang's ascension was generally tolerated because the Han dynasty had lost most of their prestige. Regardless, much of the old bureaucracy and nobility was still loyal to the Han dynasty, but these loyalists did not openly oppose the establishment of the Xin regime.

In contrast, relations with the nomadic Xiongnu confederation quickly deteriorated, and the latter intended to intervene in China around 10/11 AD. Wang responded by mobilizing 300,000 soldiers along the northern border and prevented the Xiongnu from invading China. The continuing disputes with the northern confederation resulted in Wang setting up a rival Xiongnu government in 19 AD, while maintaining the great army at the border. This drained the Xin dynasty's resources, weakening its grip on the rest of the empire.

The new emperor initiated several radical social and political reforms. These aimed at strengthening the central government, restoring the failing economy, weakening the powerful noble families, and improving the livelihood of the empire's peasants. The reforms enjoyed some initial successes, and provided a much-needed legitimacy boost to the Xin dynasty. At the same time, the reforms weakened the former imperial clan, as most of the redistributed resources had belonged to the Liu family. Furthermore, Wang patronized education based on Confucianism, taking the Duke of Zhou as his model for a good ruler. His policies were often not implemented by the old bureaucracy who resented his radical reforms. In contrast, the reforms found some acclaim among the empire's peasants.

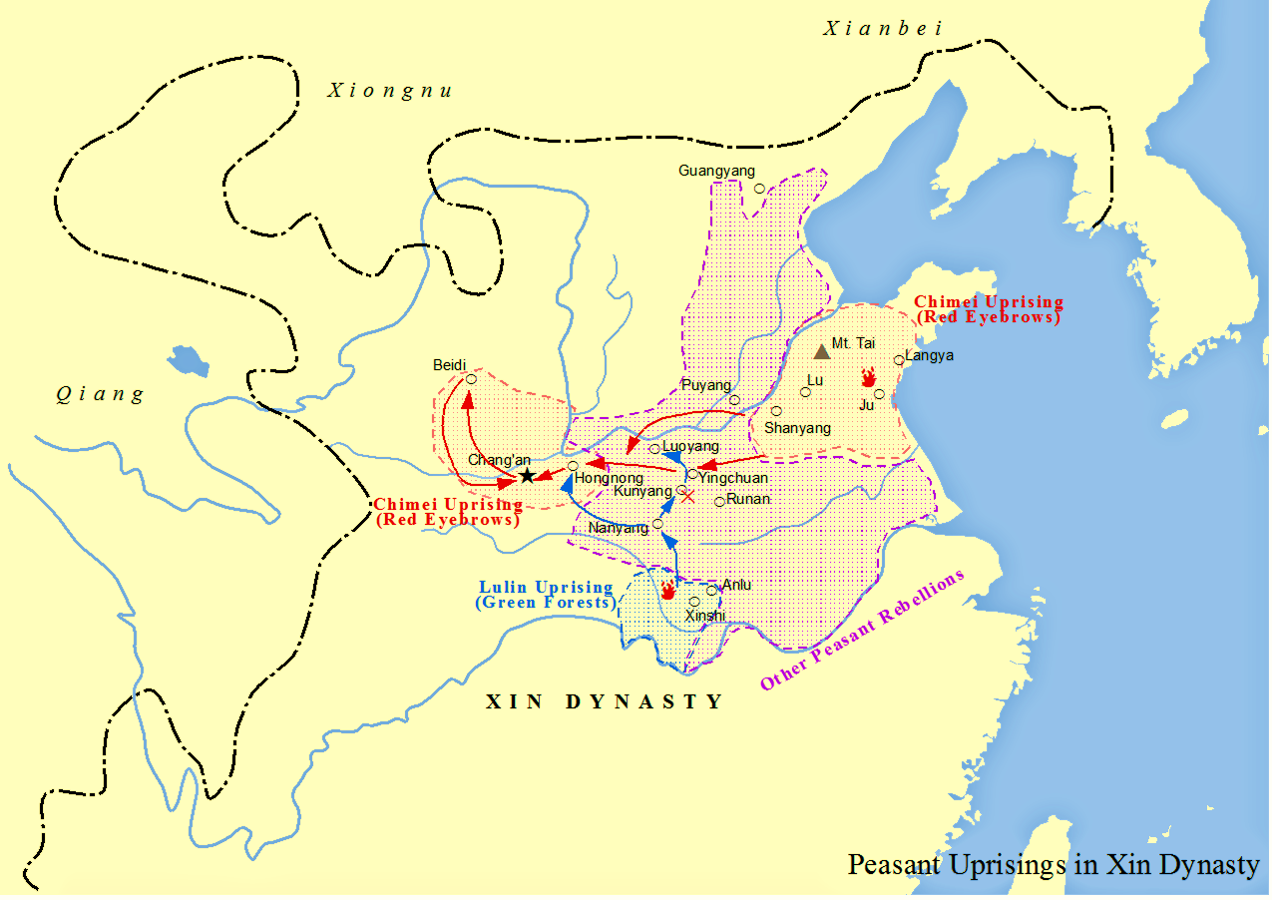
Rebellions during Wang Mang's reign

Soon after its inauguration, Wang's regime was destabilized by several natural disasters, including the Yellow River changing course, which resulted in massive floods. Plagues of locusts further worsened the situation, and widespread famines broke out. The Xin dynasty's economic policies failed to solve the ensuing crisis, and Wang Mang quickly lost the support which he had had among the peasantry as the latter struggled for survival.

The desperate peasants in the eastern parts of the empire soon turned to banditry. The bandit groups grew in strength, and numbered tens of thousands of members by the 20s AD. The most powerful factions along the Yellow River reorganized into rebel armies, known as the Red Eyebrows. The insurgents allied with discontented nobles and descendants of the former imperial clan, resulting in large-scale civil war by 19 AD. Wang Mang was forced to shift troops from other areas to deal with the Red Eyebrows, whereupon the Protectorate of the Western Regions was overrun by the Xiongnu. Smaller rebellions broke out in other parts of China. The "Troops from the Lower Yangtze" operated along this river, while two insurgent bands in Hubei were recruited by Han loyalists. Led by Liu Bosheng, they became known as the Lulin.

As civil war engulfed the entire Xin Empire, Wang's loyalist armies fought hard to keep the rebels at bay. The Xin armies scored several victories, but were completely defeated by Han restorationist armies in the Battle of Kunyang in June–July 23 AD. Upon hearing of this event, the irregular militias of Zhuang Ben and Zhuang Chun captured Chang'an in October 23, plundering the capital and killing Wang Mang. The various rebel armies subsequently fought each other to gain full control over the empire. In 25 AD, Liu Xiu was crowned as Emperor Guangwu of Han in Luoyang. The Red Eyebrows were defeated by Liu Xiu's forces in 27 AD, and he also destroyed other rival claimants as well as separatist regimes including Wang Lang's Zhao state, Gongsun Shu's Chengjia empire, and warlord Wei Ao in the northwest. By 37 AD, the Han dynasty was fully restored.

== Government ==
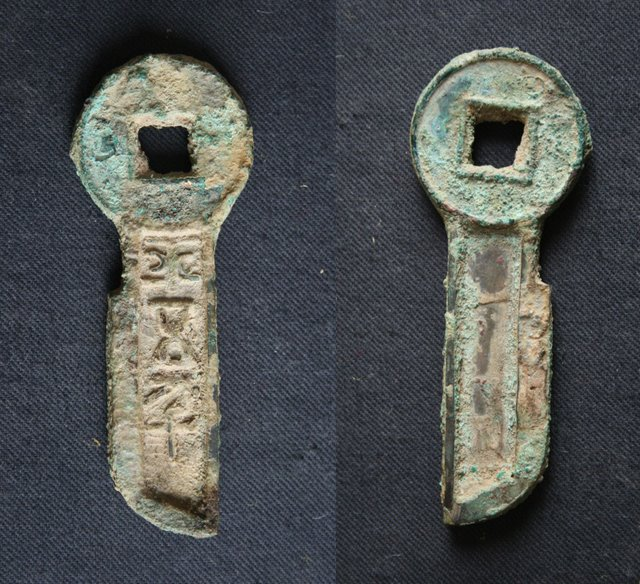
Knife-shaped coin of the Xin dynasty

Wang Mang implemented several reforms, systematically transforming the government of the Han dynasty based on his understanding of the Confucian classics and what turned out to be his faulty beliefs about the ancient Western Zhou's government system. Sinologist Li Feng described these reforms as "socialist and imperialist combined".

In order to weaken the nobles, strengthen the central government, reform the economy, and improve the peasants' situation, Wang Mang redistributed land from the rich to those who owned nothing, introduced new taxes on slave owning, prohibited the sale of slaves, and implemented limits on how much farmland one family was allowed to own.

He established the world's first income tax through a 10% tax of net earnings from wild herb and fruit collection, fishing, shepherding, and various nonagricultural activities and forms of trading. People were obligated to report their taxes to the government and officials would audit these reports. The penalty for evading this tax was one year of hard labor and confiscation of the entirety of a person's property. Because it caused popular discontent, this income tax was abolished in 22 AD.

He also nationalized farmland, and restored the government's old monopoly on the salt and iron industries. To further strengthen the empire's struggling economy and restore the government's fiscal stability, the Xin dynasty also implemented a new system to stabilize market prices, replaced the gold currency with a bronze currency, and forced nobles of marquis and lower rank to exchange all their gold for copper coins. These policies allowed the fiscally strained government to regain much-needed funds, and according to archaeologist Li Feng, they improved the economy, but caused great resentment among the nobility. Wang Mang also reduced the status of foreign vassal rulers in an attempt to strengthen the Xin empire's control over its border regions.

In an attempt to return to an idealized past, the Xin regime also implemented architectural changes to the capital Chang'an. The "Nine Temples" were constructed where the emperor worshipped the Three Sovereigns and Five Emperors, breaking with the Han dynasty's tradition to worship one's own ancestors. At the "Bright Hall", Wang Mang observed the change of the seasons in accordance with the Confucian traditions. He also opened up posts at the imperial academies, so far dominated by New Text Confucianism, for scholars who supported the Confucian Old Texts. Sinologist Hans van Ess has speculated that this was Wang Mang's attempt at achieving a better balance between the competing schools of thought, although the emperor himself probably preferred the Confucian New Texts.

Historians who lived during the Han dynasty ridiculed Wang Mang's movement to return to the order of the Zhou dynasty as neither practical nor successful, but the Xin dynasty's attempted reforms served as an inspiration for later emperors. According to archaeologist Li Feng, Wang Mang would have been "the greatest reformer in Chinese history" if his regime had survived.

== Emperor ==
Personal name	Portrait	Period of reign	Era names and dates
Wang Mang		9–23 AD	Shijianguo (始建國; Shǐ Jìan Guó; 'Start to establish a nation') 9–13 AD; Tianfeng (天鳳; Tīan Fèng; 'Heavenly Feng') 14–19 AD; Dihuang (地皇; Dì Huáng; 'Earthly Emperor') 20–23 AD

== See also ==
- Wu Zhou, a similarly short-lived interregnum established by Wu Zetian during the Tang dynasty
