= The Queens (TV series) =

Chinese historical television series

- Genre: Historical, Romance
- Written by: Chen Chiying, Wang Yi
- Directed by: Huang Jianzhong
- Starring: Yuan Li; Yehong Sang; Victor Huang; Tong Liya; Guo Zhenni
- Country of origin: China
- Original language: Mandarin
- No. of seasons: 1
- No. of episodes: 33

Production
- Producer: Li Zeng
- Running time: 45 mins

Original release
- Release: November 18, 2008

The Queens (母仪天下) is a 2008 Chinese historical television series based on the life of Wang Zhengjun, an Empress of the Han dynasty who lived during the reign of seven emperors.

== Plot ==
This story is set during the Han dynasty, and spans the reign of four emperors.

Wang Zhengjun enters the palace to become a lady-in-waiting, along with Fu Yao, Feng Yuan, Wang Zhaojun, and Li Yuan'er. Wang Zhengjun meets a court musician named Xiao Yu, and they develop feelings for each other. Fu Yao is ambitious, and wants to become Empress, while Feng Yuan just wishes to be happy. Li Yuan'er suffers the same fate as her aunt Lady Li, and Wang Zhaojun is married to the Chanyu of the Xiongnu Empire.

One day, the Empress is holding a selection for a new crown princess. The Crown Prince's favorite, Consort Sima, had suddenly died after being frightened by a dead mouse, and he was deeply saddened. Many palace women wanted to attend, in hopes of being selected and live a life of luxury. Wang Zhengjun was hesitant, but she believed she wouldn't get chosen. As she left for the selection, Xiao Yu granted her a special ornament that would give her good luck. This ornament instead helped Wang Zhengjun be selected by the Crown Prince, due to its resemblance to Consort Sima's jewelry.

Wang Zhengjun and the Crown Prince were instantly wed, and Wang Zhengjun decided to forget Xiao Yu. The Crown Prince didn't have any feelings for Wang Zhengjun, but they respected each other. Soon, Wang Zhengjun gave birth to a boy named Liu Ao. Fu Yao became increasingly jealous after seeing her former friend rise in status. She then seduced the Crown Prince, who became attracted to her and Fu Yao became one of the Crown Prince's concubines. The Crown Prince also met Feng Yuan one day, and decided to take Feng Yuan as a concubine too after complimenting her personality.

Soon, the Crown Prince ascends to the throne as Emperor Yuan of Han. Wang Zhengjun becomes the Empress, while Fu Yao and Feng Yuan become Zhaoyi, which is the second rank for consorts. Fu Yao is displeased with her status and wishes to replace Wang Zhengjun as Empress. Her jealousy is shown when Feng Yuan is complimented after protecting the Emperor from a bear. Wang Zhengjun, Fu Yao, and Feng Yuan all have one son, but the Emperor selects Wang Zhengjun's son as the Crown Prince. Fu Yao does her best to ensure her son becomes the next Emperor, and almost succeeds, but Xiao Yu and the other officials persuade the Emperor to keep Liu Ao as Crown Prince. After the Emperor dies, Wang Zhengjun becomes Empress Dowager and her son becomes Emperor Cheng of Han.

Fu Yao and Feng Yuan are sent to smaller kingdoms, where their sons remain princes. Fu Yao is not content with her life as princess dowager, and seeks to replace Emperor Cheng with her own son, Liu Kang. Since Emperor Cheng had many favorites, Fu Yao trained two girls named Zhao Feiyan and Zhao Hede as dancers to gain the favor of the Emperor. Emperor Cheng was in love with his Empress and another consort, but he didn't have any children. He arrived at Fu Yao's palace, where he met and fell in love with Zhao Feiyan. He took Zhao Feiyan and Zhao Hede as his consorts and brought them back to the palace. However, Fu Yao's son Liu Kang was in love with Zhao Feiyan, and died of grief. Fu Yao was saddened, but was determined to make her grandson Liu Xin would become Emperor.

Zhao Feiyan and Zhao Hede retained the favor of Emperor Cheng, and Zhao Feiyan wanted to become Empress. She accused Empress Xu of witchcraft, which led to her downfall. Another one of Emperor Cheng's favorites, Consort Ban became a servant of Wang Zhengjun. Wang Zhengjun didn't like the Zhao sisters, but she couldn't do anything about it. Zhao Feiyan became the new Empress, but soon lost favor to her sister. She wanted to have a son, but she realized that Fu Yao gave her a medicine that helped her become flexible at dancing. This medicine would let her never be able to bear a child. Zhao Feiyan and Zhao Hede briefly reconcile, and they murder all of Emperor Cheng's existing sons. Emperor Cheng soon dies from pills that Zhao Hede gave him, and names Liu Xin as the next Emperor.

Fu Yao finally returns to the palace as her grandson is now Emperor. To get rid of Wang Zhengjun's allies, Fu Yao sentences Xiao Yu to death. Fu Yao believes that she can finally become Grand Empress Dowager, but her plan fails. She is stopped by Wang Zhengjun, and is forced to return to her small kingdom of Dingtao.

== Cast ==
- Yuan Li as Wang Zhengjun
- Yehong Sang as Fu Yao
- Victor Huang as Xiao Yu
- Wu Junchen as Emperor Yuan
- Sun Qian as Feng Yuan
- Tong Liya as Zhao Feiyan
- Guo Zhenni as Zhao Hede
- Ren Donglin as Emperor Cheng
- Tian Ye as Consort Ban
- Shi Xiaoqun as Lady Li/Li Yuan'er
- Bai Qinglin as Wang Zhaojun
- Lian Lian as Xu E
- Zhang Di as Liu Xin/Liu Kang

== Production ==
The main character Wang Zhengjun was the longest living empress in the history of China. Yuan Li, the actress who portrayed Wang Zhengjun had previously played Zhao Hede and helped Guo Zhenni in her role.

The television series helped propel Tong Liya to fame for her portrayal of Zhao Feiyan.
