= Feng Yuan =

Han dynasty imperial consort (died 6 BC)

- Zhaoyi; Queen Dowager of Xindu; Queen Dowager of Zhongshan
- Spouse: Emperor Yuan of Han
- Issue: Liu Xing, Prince of Zhongshan
- Father: Feng Fengshi

Feng Yuan (馮媛, imperial title Zhaoyi (昭儀), died 6 BC) was an imperial consort during China's Han dynasty. She was a favourite of Emperor Yuan. She was viewed largely positively for her heroism and (presumed) humility, and viewed sympathetically for her death at the hand of her romantic rival Consort Fu.

== Family background ==
It is not known when Feng Yuan was born. Her father Feng Fengshi (馮奉世) was a famous general during the reign of Emperor Xuan, and continued to serve in a number of important posts in the imperial government thereafter. She had nine brothers and three sisters. Her brothers Feng Yewang (馮野王), Feng Jun (馮逡), Feng Li (馮立), and Feng Can (馮參) all later became important officials as well.

== As imperial consort ==
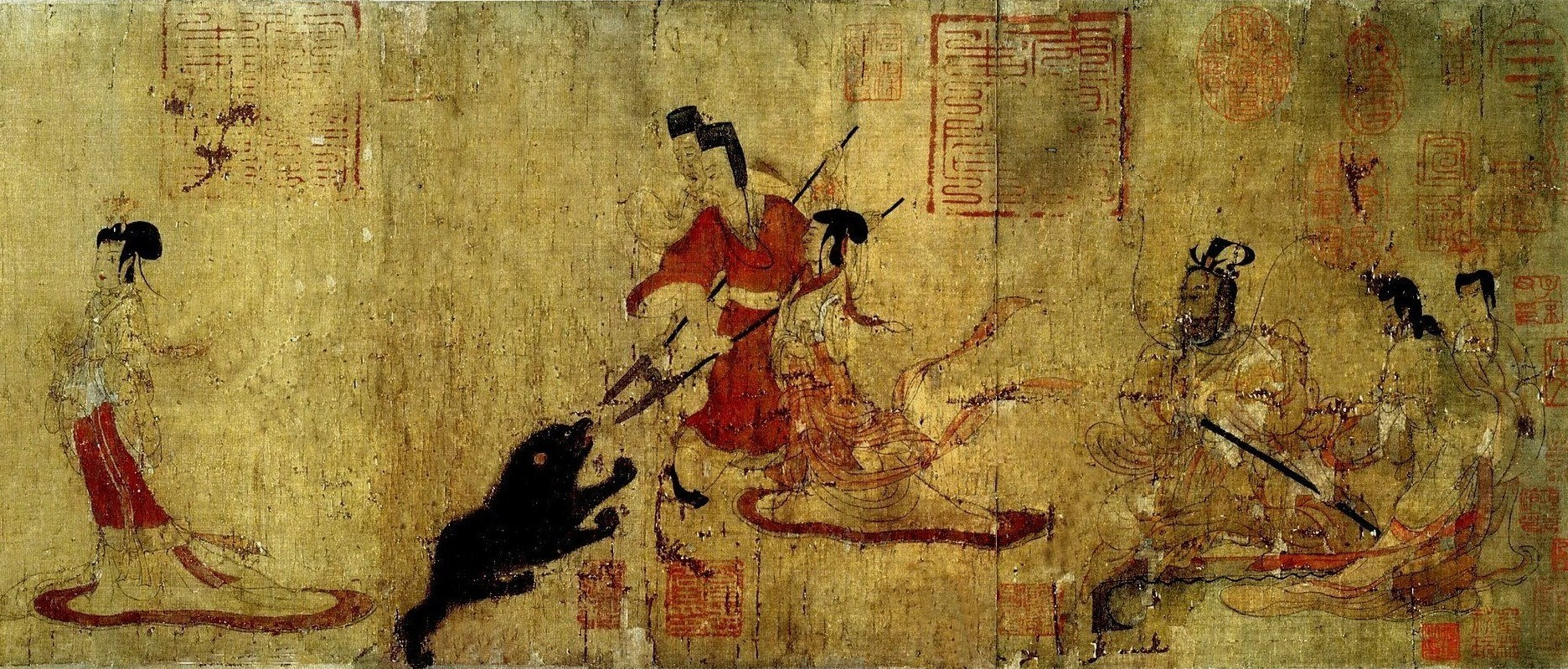
A scene in the Admonitions Scroll depicting Consort Feng (woman at center) defending Emperor Yuan (man at right) from the bear. Consort Fu is depicted on the left, fleeing.

Feng Yuan became a consort to Emperor Yuan in 47 BC, the second year of his reign. She quickly became a favorite of his, along with Consort Fu. Consort Feng, along with Consort Fu, was given the imperial title Zhaoyi (昭儀) by Emperor Yuan, which is higher than any other imperial consort and one rank lower than the empress. She had a son with him, Liu Xing (劉興), who was later made the Prince of Xindu in c.July 37 BC.

While both Consorts Fu and Feng were imperial consorts who it seems that both of them were equally admired and loved by Emperor Yuan, an incident occurred that would cause Consort Feng to be greatly praised and respected, at Fu's embarrassment and jealousy. In 38 BC, while Emperor Yuan was watching a fight between wild animals, accompanied by a number of his concubines (but apparently not by Empress Wang Zhengjun), a wild bear broke loose and tried to get out of the cage. All of the noble men and women present, including Consort Fu, fled the scene. Only Feng stepped toward the wild bear, which was killed at the last moment by imperial guards. When Emperor Yuan asked her why she did so, Consort Feng replied that she had heard that once a bear had caught one person, it would continue attacking just that victim and no one else; because she was afraid that the bear would attack the emperor, she was willing to sacrifice herself. Consort Fu became greatly jealous of the praise that Feng received for this incident.

In recorded history, Consort Fu was ambitious, jealous, cunning, and domineering, and tried in every way to eliminate her rival and control the men in her family, but while Consort Feng is famous in history for her humility, respect, compassion and kindness, she just tries to live a peaceful life and protect her family. Consort Feng was never recorded in history as having had the same ambition that her rival Consort Fu had at displacing Crown Prince Liu Ao, the son of Empress Wang Zhengjun, with her son. This might have been because her son was younger not only to the crown prince, but also to Consort Fu's son Liu Kang (劉康), or it could have been that she was humbler and less ambitious.

During Consort Feng's years as imperial consort, Emperor Yuan considered promoting her brother Yewang to prime minister or similar positions due to his abilities, but each time thought that he would be criticized for an appearance of nepotism, and so never actually promoted Yewang as such.

== As princess dowager ==
In 33 BC, Emperor Yuan died, and Crown Prince Ao ascended the throne as Emperor Cheng. Prince Xing went to his principality at Xindu, and Consort Feng went with him with the title Princess Dowager. When Prince Xing's principality was moved to Zhongshan (roughly modern Baoding, Hebei) in 23 BC, Prince Dowager Feng was similarly moved with her son. Not much is known about her years in Zhongshan. In 24 BC, Emperor Cheng considered making her brother Yewang commander of the armed forces, replacing his own uncle Wang Feng (王鳳), whose autocratic nature he had become resentful of, but he changed his mind after the news was leaked. In retaliation, Wang Feng removed Feng Yewang from his posts.

In 9 BC, Emperor Cheng, sonless, appeared to come to the resolution of making either his younger brother Prince Xing or his nephew Prince Liu Xin of Dingtao (Prince Kang's son) his heir. Emperor Cheng became convinced that Prince Xin was more capable, and at the same time, Prince Xin's grandmother, Consort Fu, was endearing herself to Emperor Cheng's wife, Empress Zhao Feiyan, her sister and Emperor Cheng's favorite Consort Zhao Hede, and Emperor Cheng's uncle Wang Gen with lavish gifts, and so the Zhaos and Wang Gen both praised Prince Xin as well. (There was no evidence that Consort Feng carried out similar lobbying effort on behalf of her son.) Emperor Cheng made Prince Xin crown prince in 8 BC.

In 7 BC, Emperor Cheng died, and Prince Xin ascended the throne as Emperor Ai. In the same year, Prince Xing also died, and his only son, the two-year-old Prince Jizi, succeeded him as the Prince of Zhongshan. Princess Dowager Feng continued to serve as princess dowager.

== Death ==
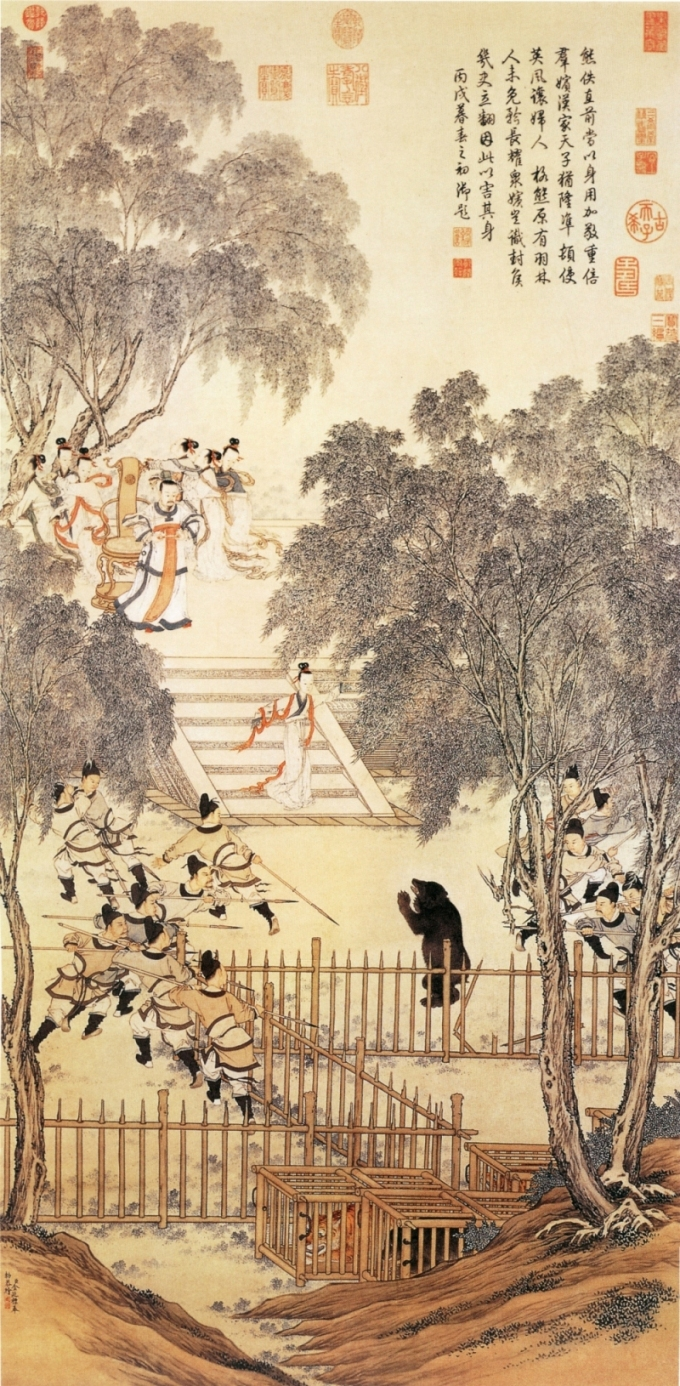
Painting of Jieyu Blocking a Bear (婕妤擋熊圖), a painting by Jin Tingbiao, Palace Museum, Beijing. Lady Feng was depicted standing on the flight of steps, stretching out her arms.

Prince Jizi was born with a heart ailment, which when afflicting him, caused him to have circulation problems, manifesting itself outwardly as having his lips and appendages turn blue. Princess Dowager Feng raised him personally. She also often prayed to the gods. In 6 BC, Emperor Ai, hearing about his cousin's illness, sent imperial physicians along with his attendant Zhang You (張由) to go to Zhongshan to treat Prince Jizi. This, however, would have dire consequences of Princess Dowager Feng.

When the imperial attendant Zhang got to Zhongshan, suddenly, in a rage, left there and returned to the capital Chang'an. Once he did and was ordered to explain his conduct, he made up a false reason that he had discovered that Princess Dowager Feng was using witchcraft to curse Emperor Ai and his grandmother, Consort Fu, who by now carried the title empress dowager. Empress Dowager Fu, still resentful of Princess Dowager Feng from the days when they were romantic rivals, decided to use this opportunity to strike at Princess Dowager Feng. She sent a eunuch, Shi Li (史立), to serve as investigator, and Shi tortured a good number of Princess Dowager Feng's relations (including her younger sister Feng Xi (馮習) and her sister-in-law Junzhi (君之), one of her younger brothers'wife), some to death, but still could not build a solid case against Princess Dowager Feng. Shi Li decided to show Princess Dowager Feng who was actually behind the investigation, by referring to an incident in which then-Consort Feng defended Emperor Yuan against a bear which had broken loose. Princess Dowager Feng, realizing that Empress Dowager Fu was behind the investigation, went back to her palace and committed suicide. In total, 17 members of the Feng clan died as a result of the investigations. Prince Jizi, then still a toddler, was spared.

Before she committed suicide, Princess Dowager Feng reportedly said the following:

That incident (involving the bear) happened deep in the palace and long ago, during a previous reign. How could this minor official know about it? It is clear that someone wants me dead, and would not stop until I am.

In 1 BC, after the deaths of Empress Dowager Fu and Emperor Ai, and after Emperor Yuan's wife Grand Empress Dowager Wang had seized power back from Emperor Ai's male favorite (and probable lover) Dong Xian, Princess Dowager Feng's reputation was restored. Later that year, her grandson Prince Jizi would become emperor, although as effectively a young puppet of Grand Empress Dowager Wang's nephew Wang Mang. Wang Mang would eventually murder him in 5 CE and usurp the Han throne in 8.
