= Empress Xu =

Empress Xu may mean or refer to:

- Empress Xu Pingjun (許平君) (died 71 BC), wife of Emperor Xuan of Han
- Empress Xu (Cheng) (許皇后, personal name unknown) (died 8 BC), wife of Emperor Cheng of Han
- Empress Renxiaowen (徐皇后, personal name unknown) (1362–1407), wife of the Yongle Emperor of the Ming dynasty
