= Grand empress dowager =

Title given to East Asian royal women

Grand empress dowager (also grand dowager empress or grand empress mother) (Chinese and Japanese: 太皇太后; pinyin: tàihuángtàihòu; rōmaji: taikōtaigō; Korean: 태황태후 (太皇太后); romaja: Tae Hwang Tae Hu; Vietnamese: Thái Hoàng thái hậu (太皇太后) was a title given to the grandmother, or a woman from the same generation, of a Chinese, Japanese, Korean, or Vietnamese emperor in the Chinese cultural sphere.

Some grand empresses dowager held regency during the emperor's childhood. Some of the most prominent empress dowagers extended their regencies beyond the time when the emperor was old enough to govern alone. This was seen as a source of political turmoil, according to the traditional views of Chinese historians.

== Chinese grand empresses dowager ==
=== Han dynasty ===
- Grand Empress Dowager Lü Zhi (188 BC – 180 BC), during the reign of Emperor Qianshao and Emperor Houshao
- Grand Empress Dowager Bo (156 BC – 155 BC), during the reign of Emperor Jing
- Grand Empress Dowager Dou (141 BC – 135 BC), during the reign of Emperor Wu
- Grand Empress Dowager Shangguan (74 BC – 37 BC), during the reign of Emperor Xuan and Emperor Yuan
- Grand Empress Dowager Qiongcheng (33 BC – 16 BC), during the reign of Emperor Cheng
- Grand Empress Dowager Wang Zhengjun (7 BC – 13 AD), during the reign of Emperor Ai and Emperor Ping
- Grand Empress Dowager Fu (帝太太后 instead of 太皇太后) (7 BC – 3 BC), during the reign of Emperor Ai

=== Cao Wei ===
- Grand Empress Dowager Bian (226–230), during the reign of Emperor Ming

=== Jin dynasty (266–420) ===
- Grand Empress Dowager Li Lingrong (397–400), during the reign of Emperor An

=== Liu Song dynasty ===
- Grand Empress Dowager Xiao Wenshou (422–423), during the reign of Emperor Shao
- Grand Empress Dowager Lu Huinan (464–466), during the reign of Emperor Qianfei

=== Chen dynasty ===
- Grand Empress Dowager Zhang Yao'er (566–568), during the reign of Emperor Fei

=== Northern Wei dynasty ===
- Grand Empress Dowager Helian (452–453), during the reign of Emperor Wencheng
- Grand Empress Dowager Feng (471–490), during the reign of Emperor Xiaowen
- Grand Empress Dowager Lou Zhaojun (559–560), during the reign of Emperor Fei

=== Northern Qi dynasty ===
- Grand Empress Dowager Hu (577), during the reign of Emperor Youzhu

=== Northern Zhou dynasty ===
- Grand Empress Dowager Ashina (579–581), during the reign of Emperor Jing

=== Tang dynasty ===
- Grand Empress Dowager Guo (824–848), during the reign of Emperor Jingzong, Emperor Wenzong, Emperor Wuzong and Emperor Xuānzong
- Grand Empress Dowager Zheng (859–865), during the reign of Emperor Yizong

=== Song dynasty ===
- Grand Empress Dowager Cao (1067–1085), during the reign of Emperor Shenzong
- Grand Empress Dowager Gao Taotao (1085–1093), during the reign of Emperor Zhezong
- Grand Empress Dowager Wu (1189–1197), during the reign of Emperor Guangzong
- Grand Empress Dowager Xie (1194–1203), during the reign of Emperor Ningzong
- Grand Empress Dowager Xie Daoqing (1274–1276), during the reign of Emperor Gong; the proceeding two emperors were her grandsons but they were fleeing from the Mongols

=== Liao dynasty ===
- Grand Empress Dowager Xiao Yanmujin (died 933), during the reign of Emperor Taizong
- Grand Empress Dowager Xiao Noujin (1055–1057), during the reign of Emperor Daozong
- Grand Empress Dowager Xiao Dali (1101–1118), during the reign of Emperor Tianzuo

=== Jin dynasty (1115–1234) ===
- Tangkuo, Grand Empress Dowager of Qingyuan Palace (1135–1136), during the reign of Emperor Xizong
- Heshilie, Grand Empress Dowager of Mingde Palace (1135–1143), during the reign of Emperor Xizong

=== Yuan dynasty ===
- Grand Empress Dowager Dagi (1321–1322), during the reign of Emperor Yingzong
- Grand Empress Dowager Budashiri (1333–1338), during the reign of Emperor Huizong

=== Ming dynasty ===
- Grand Empress Dowager Zhang (1435–1442), during the reign of the Zhengtong Emperor
- Grand Empress Dowager Zhou (1487–1504), during the reign of the Hongzhi Emperor
- Grand Empress Dowager Wang (1505–1518), during the reign of both the Hongzhi Emperor and the Zhengde Emperor
- Grand Empress Dowager Shou'an (1521-1522), during the reign of the Jiajing Emperor
- Grand Empress Dowager Zheng (1565–1630) (posthumous title), awarded by the Hongguang Emperor

=== Qing dynasty ===
- Grand Empress Dowager Zhaosheng (1661–1688), during the reign of the Kangxi Emperor
- Grand Empress Dowager Cixi (1875–1908), during the reign of the Xuantong Emperor (Puyi)

== See also ==
- Empress dowager
- Từ Dụ (1810–1902), Vietnamese royal and only ever person to be crowned Great Grand Empress Dowager
