= Consort Fu (Yuan) =

Consort Fu 傅昭儀/傅昭仪

Grand empress dowager of the Han Dynasty (帝太太后)
- Tenure: 7 BC – 21 February 2 BC

Empress Dowager Gong of Dingtao (定陶共皇太后)
- Tenure: 7 - 5 B.C.

Princess Dowager Fu of Dingtao (定陶傅王太后)
- Tenure: September or October 23 - 7 B.C.

Princess dowager of Dingtao (定陶王太后)
- Tenure: 27 - September or October 23 B.C.

Princess Dowager of Shanyang (山阳王太后)
- Tenure: 33 - 27 B.C.
- Born: Unknown; Henei Commandery, (roughly modern Handan, Hebei)
- Died: 21 February 2 BC
- Spouse: Emperor Yuan of Han
- Issue: Liu Kang, Prince Gong of Dingtao; Princess Pingdu
Posthumous name
- Empress Xiaoyuan Fu (孝元傅皇后) (Note: Revoked in 1 B.C.)
- Clan: Fu (傅) (by birth); Liu (劉) (by marriage)

Consort Fu (傅昭儀, personal name unknown; died 21 February 2 BC) was an imperial consort during the Han dynasty of China. She was a consort and a favourite of Emperor Yuan. She was known to be a domineering woman who wanted her son on the throne, and, failing that, wanted (and eventually was able to see) her grandson on the throne as Emperor Ai. During Emperor Ai's reign, she exerted heavy and frequent influence on his reign, that made her powerful and dominant and forcibly extracted empress dowager titles that she should not have properly possessed (since she was never an empress – and Emperor Cheng's mother, Grand Empress Dowager Wang Zhengjun was still alive) – which would bring her hatred from the Wang clan and eventually the desecration of her tomb after her death.

== Family background ==
Consort Fu's father was from the Commandery of Henei (roughly modern Handan, Hebei) and died early. Her mother remarried a man named Zheng (鄭) after her father's death. When Consort Fu was young, she was a lady-in-waiting for Grand Empress Dowager Shangguan.

== Years as imperial consort ==
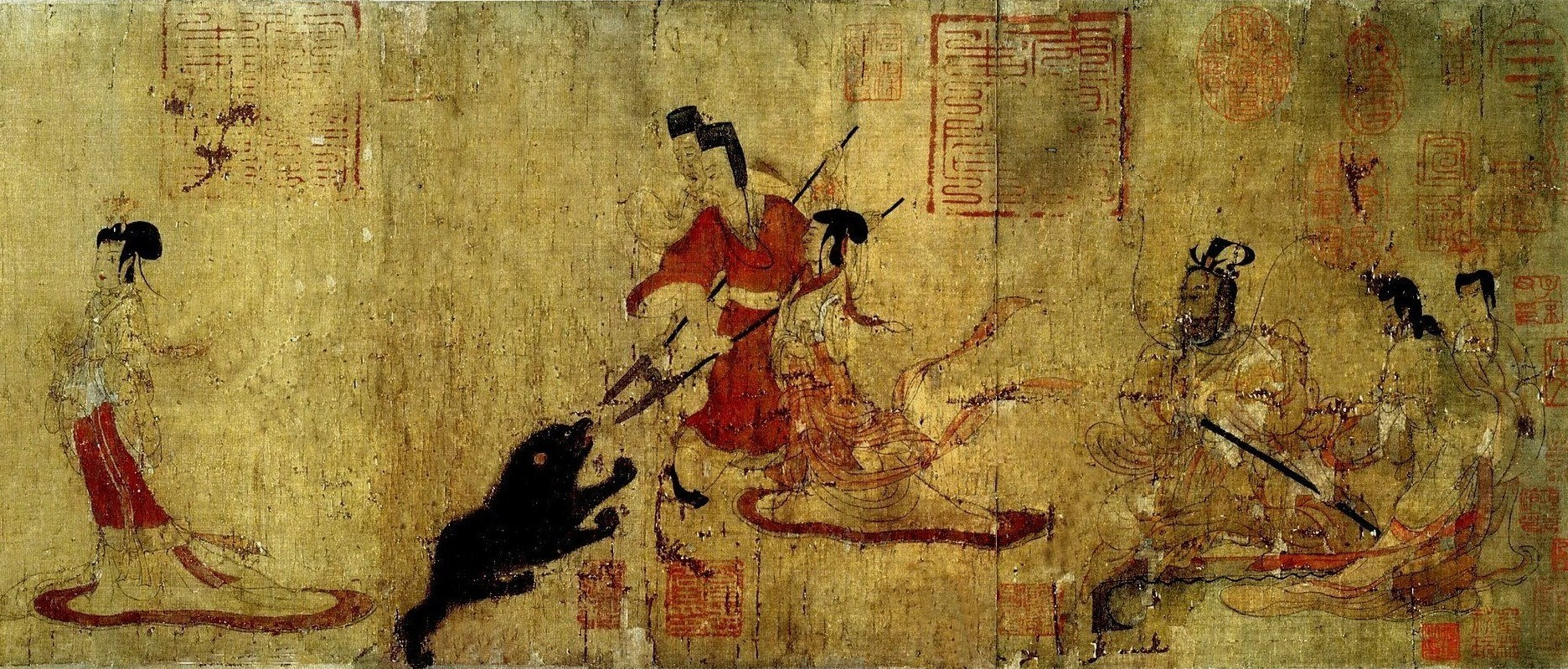
A scene in the Admonitions Scroll depicting Consort Feng (woman at centre) defending Emperor Yuan (man at right) from the bear. Consort Fu is depicted on the left, fleeing.

It is not known when exactly Consort Fu became a consort to Emperor Yuan, but it is known that it happened during his years as crown prince – but after his eventual wife Empress Wang became a consort of his. She and Consort Feng Yuan became his favorite concubines, and each of them bore him a son. Consort Fu's son was Liu Kang (劉康), who later was created the Prince of Jiyang in April or May 41 BC, then Prince of Shanyang in 34 BC, then Prince of Dingtao in 27 BC. As Consort Fu's position was inferior to that of Empress Wang, and her son younger than Empress Wang's son Liu Ao (later Emperor Cheng), Prince Ao was created crown prince. However, Consort Fu was not content for her son merely to be an imperial prince, and a succession struggle would erupt.

As Crown Prince Ao grew older, Emperor Yuan became increasingly unhappy with his fitness as imperial heir and impressed with Consort Fu's son, Prince Kang. Several incidents led to this situation. One happened in 35 BC, when Emperor Yuan's youngest brother Prince Liu Jing of Zhongshan (中山王劉竟) died, Emperor Yuan became angry when he felt that the teenage Crown Prince Ao was insufficiently grieving – particularly because Princes Ao and Jing were of similar age and grew up together as playmates – and showing insufficient respect to Prince Jing. Prince Ao's head of household Shi Dan (史丹), a relative of Emperor Yuan's grandmother and a senior official respected by Emperor Yuan, managed to convince Emperor Yuan that Crown Prince Ao was trying to stop Emperor Yuan himself from over-grieving, but the seed of dissatisfaction was sown.

As the princes further grew, several things further led to an endearment between Emperor Yuan and Prince Kang. They shared affection and skills in music – particularly in the playing of drums. Prince Kang also showed high intelligence and diligence, while Crown Prince Ao was known for drinking and womanizing. When Emperor Yuan grew ill circa 35 BC – an illness that he would not recover from – Consort Fu and Prince Kang were often summoned to his sickbed to attend to him, while Empress Wang and Crown Prince Ao rarely were. In his illness, apparently encouraged by Consort Fu, Emperor Yuan reconsidered whether he should make Prince Kang his heir instead. Only the intercession of Shi Dan – who risked his life by stepping onto the carpet of the imperial bed chamber, an act that only the empress was allowed to do, at the pain of death – led Emperor Yuan to cease those thoughts. When Emperor Yuan died in July 33 BC, Crown Prince Ao ascended the throne (as Emperor Cheng).

While both Consorts Fu and Feng were imperial consorts, an incident occurred that would cause Consort Feng to be greatly praised, at Consort Fu's embarrassment. In 38 BC, Emperor Yuan was watching a fight between wild animals, accompanied by a number of his concubines (but apparently not by Empress Wang). A wild bear broke loose and tried to get out of the cage. All of the noble men and women who accompanied Emperor Yuan, including Consort Fu, fled, but Consort Feng stepped towards the wild bear, which, however, was killed at the last moment by imperial guards. Emperor Yuan asked her why she did so. Consort Feng replied that she had heard that bears, once they had caught one person, would attack just that person and no one else; because she was afraid that the bear would attack the emperor, she was willing to sacrifice herself. Consort Fu became greatly jealous of the praise that Consort Feng received for this incident.

== As princess dowager ==
After Emperor Yuan's death, Prince Kang went to his Principality of Shanyang. Consort Fu received the title of princess dowager. She was not content with this status, however, and continued to wish for her son to become emperor. In 27 BC, Prince Kang's principality was moved to Dingtao, and Princess Dowager Fu went with him. When Prince Kang's consort Consort Ding gave birth to his son Liu Xin, it was Princess Dowager Fu – not Consort Ding – who raised him, nurturing him to be particularly close to her and dominated by her.

The fraternal relationship between Emperor Cheng and Prince Kang was quite affectionate, notwithstanding the succession struggle, and Prince Kang was often summoned to the capital Chang'an to accompany Emperor Cheng, who was sonless. Prince Kang was viewed by many as the potential heir – a status that was greatly despised by Emperor Cheng's uncles from the Wang clan. Consort Fu was happy to see this situation develop. In 24 BC, however, under pressure from his uncles, Emperor Cheng was forced to send Prince Kang back to his principality, and it would appear that the brothers did not see each other again alive, as Prince Kang died in September or October 23 BC and was succeeded by his son Prince Xin.

Princess Dowager Fu continued to carry her title after her son's death (as the Han dynasty did not appear to have a title such as "grand princess dowager"), and she maintained a strong grip on her grandson, the person now that she wants to eventually become emperor. As Emperor Cheng continued to be sonless, in 9 BC, he considered making either his younger brother Prince Liu Xing of Zhongshan or his nephew Prince Xin his heir. Emperor Cheng became convinced that Prince Xin was more capable, and at the same time, Princess Dowager Fu was endearing herself to Emperor Cheng's wife Empress Zhao Feiyan, her sister and favourite of Emperor Cheng Consort Zhao Hede, and Emperor Cheng's uncle Wang Gen with lavish gifts, and so the Zhaos and Wang Gen both praised Prince Xin as well. Emperor Cheng made Prince Xin crown prince in March 8 BC. Emperor Cheng, under the rationale that Prince Xin was now his adopted son and no longer Prince Kang's son, refused to allow Princess Dowager Fu and her daughter-in-law Consort Ding to see Prince Xin, but the more lenient Empress Dowager Wang allowed Princess Dowager Fu to see her grandson under the rationale that she was like a wet nurse.

== Domination of her grandson's reign ==
Emperor Cheng died suddenly in April 7 BC, and Prince Xin ascended the throne as Emperor Ai. Almost immediately, the issue of the roles of Princess Dowager Fu and Consort Ding (and what honour, if any, to posthumously bestow on Emperor Ai's father Prince Kang) would quickly erupt into a major controversy. Initially, Grand Empress Dowager Wang decreed that Princess Dowager Fu and Consort Ding see him periodically, every 10 days. However, Princess Dowager Fu quickly began to visit her grandson everyday, and she insisted that two things be done: that she receive an Empress Dowager title, and that her relatives be granted titles, like the Wangs. Grand Empress Dowager Wang, sympathetic of the bind that Emperor Ai was in, first granted Prince Kang the unusual title of "Emperor Gong of Dingtao" (定陶共皇) and then, under the rationale of that title, granted Princess Dowager Fu the title "Empress Dowager Gong of Dingtao" (定陶共皇太后) and Consort Ding the title "Empress Gong of Dingtao" (定陶共皇后). Several members of the Fu and Ding clans were created marquesses. Grand Empress Dowager Wang also ordered her nephew Wang Mang, the commander of the armed forces, to resign and transfer power to the Fus and the Dings. Emperor Ai declined and begged Wang Mang to stay in his administration. Several months later, however, there would be another direct confrontation between Wang Mang and now-Empress Dowager Fu. At a major imperial banquet, the official in charge of seating placed Empress Dowager Fu's seat next to Grand Empress Dowager Wang's. When Wang Mang saw this, he rebuked the official and ordered that Empress Dowager Fu's seat be moved to the side, which drew great ire from Empress Dowager Fu, who refused to attend the banquet. To soothe her anger, Wang Mang resigned, and Emperor Ai approved his resignation. After Wang Mang's resignation, the Wangs gradually and inexorably began to lose their power. At Empress Dowager Fu's behest, the Fus and the Dings were installed in their place.

Empress Dowager Fu was not satisfied with what she saw was her inferior title (as only empress dowager, not grand empress dowager, and with the qualifier "of Dingtao"). Several key officials who opposed her move were reduced to commoner status without any other fault – including the prime minister Kong Guang (孔光) and the prime inspector Shi Dan (師丹) – two of the top three officials of the administration. The third one, Empress Dowager Fu's cousin Fu Xi (傅喜), who also opposed Empress Dowager Fu's actions notwithstanding his relationship with her, was removed from his position and sent back to his march.

In 6 BC, Empress Dowager Fu would further display her power and at the same time cause the people to be even more disappointed in Emperor Ai. Emperor Ai's cousin Liu Jizi (劉箕子), the Prince of Zhongshan (Prince Xing's son), had a congenital heart disorder, and his grandmother Feng Yuan, the princess dowager, cared for his treatment and often worshipped gods to pray for his healing. Emperor Ai, up on hearing his cousin's illness, sent imperial physicians along with his attendant Zhang You (張由) to go to Zhongshan (roughly modern Baoding, Hebei) to treat Prince Jizi. Zhang, however, was himself afflicted with a psychiatric condition (probably bipolar disorder), and when he got to Zhongshan, he suddenly, in a rage, left there and returned to Chang'an. Once he did and was ordered to explain his conduct, he made up a false reason – that he had discovered that Princess Dowager Feng was using witchcraft to curse Emperor Ai and Empress Dowager Fu. Empress Dowager Fu and Princess Dowager Feng were romantic rivals when they were both consorts to Emperor Yuan, and Empress Dowager Fu decided to use this opportunity to strike at Princess Dowager Feng. She sent a eunuch, Shi Li (史立), to serve as investigator, and Shi tortured a good number of Princess Dowager Feng's relations (including her sister Feng Xi (馮習) and her sister-in-law Junzhi (君之), some to death, but still could not build a solid case against Princess Dowager Feng. Shi Li decided to show Princess Dowager Feng who was actually behind the investigation, by referring to the wild bear incident. Princess Dowager Feng, realizing that Empress Dowager Fu was behind the investigation, went back to her palace and committed suicide. In total, 17 members of the Feng clan died as a result of the investigations. This was immediately viewed as a political case, and officials and the people all became disappointed in Emperor Ai.

In 5 BC, Empress Dowager Fu would finally get what she wanted. Emperor Ai removed the qualification "of Dingtao" from his father's posthumous title (thus making him simply "Emperor Gong"), and then gave his grandmother a variation of the grand empress dowager title (ditaitaihou (帝太太后), compared to Grand Empress Dowager Wang's title taihuangtaihou (太皇太后)) and his mother a variation of the empress dowager title (ditaihou (帝太后), compared to Empress Dowager Zhao's title huangtaihou (皇太后)), and there were therefore now four official empresses dowager in the capital, each with a full budget.

Grand Empress Dowager Fu died in February 2 BC, and was buried with Emperor Yuan – an act that drew even greater hatred from the Wangs, because now there would be no place for Grand Empress Dowager Wang, Emperor Yuan's wife, to be buried after her death. Further, Emperor Ai granted her a posthumous empress title, which was viewed to be inappropriate and disrespectful to Grand Empress Dowager Wang.

== Posthumous developments ==
After Emperor Ai died in August 1 BC, Grand Empress Dowager Wang quickly seized power from Emperor Ai's male favourite and probable lover Dong Xian, and summoned Wang Mang back to Chang'an to serve as regent to the new Emperor Ping – the former Prince Jizi of Zhongshan. Wang Mang, bearing grudges against Grand Empress Dowager Fu and Emperor Ai, would immediately undertake several punitive actions against her posthumously. He had her title stripped, and further stripped her of her original title as princess dowager – and had her referred merely as "the mother of Prince Gong of Dingtao" (while her daughter-in-law suffered a similar posthumous demotion to "Consort Ding").

Against Grand Empress Dowager Wang's initial sentiment of stopping the punitive actions at this point, Wang Mang went further. In 5, he persuaded Grand Empress Dowager Wang to allow him to disinter Consorts Fu and Ding's caskets and strip their bodies of jade burial shells, and then returned to Dingtao to be buried there. Their tombs were then completely flattened and surrounded with thorns. According to legend, when their tombs were opened up, great fires started, damaging their bodies and the burial items.

== Titles ==
- Lady Fu (傅氏; until an unknown date)
- Palace Maid (宫女; from an unknown date)
- During the reign of Emperor Xuan (r. 74 - 48 BC)
  - Concubine of the Crown Prince (from an unknown date)
- During the reign of Emperor Yuan (r. 48 - 33 BC)
  - Lady of Handsome Fairness (婕妤; from an unknown date), second rank consort
  - Lady of Bright Deportment (昭儀; from an unknown date), first rank consort
- During the reign of Emperor Cheng (r. 33 - 7 BC)
  - Princess Dowager of Shanyang (山阳王太后; from 33 B.C.)
  - Princess dowager of Dingtao (定陶王太后; from 27 B.C.)
  - Princess Dowager Fu of Dingtao (定陶傅王太后; from September or October 23 B.C.)
- During the reign of Emperor Ai (r. 7 - 1 BC)
  - Empress Dowager Gong of Dingtao (定陶共皇太后; from 7 B.C.)
  - Grand Empress Dowager (帝太太后; from 5 B.C.)
  - Empress Xiaoyuan Fu (孝元傅皇后; from February 2 B.C.)
- During the reign of Emperor Ping (r. 1 BC - 6 AD)
  - Mother of Prince Gong of Dingtao (定陶恭王母; from 1 B.C.)
