= Empress Xu (Cheng) =

Empress of Han China from 31 to 17 BC

Empress Xu (Chinese: 許皇后) (personal name unknown, but likely Xu Kua [許誇]) (died c.December 8 BC) was an empress during the Han dynasty, who came from a powerful family. She was initially loved by her husband Emperor Cheng, but she eventually lost favor, and as a result of the machinations of her eventual successor, Empress Zhao Feiyan, she was deposed. After she was removed, she tried in vain to regain a measure of dignity by conspiring with her husband's cousin Chunyu Zhang (淳于長), but that conspiracy would eventually lead to her being forced to commit suicide.

== Family background and marriage to then-Crown Prince Ao ==
Empress Xu was a daughter of Xu Jia (許嘉), the Marquess of Ping'en and a brother of Emperor Xuan's first wife Empress Xu Pingjun, who was the mother of Emperor Yuan. Emperor Yuan frequently grieved for his mother because she was murdered while he was still young by Huo Guang's wife Xian (顯), so he resolved to marry a daughter of the Xu clan to his son, Crown Prince Ao (劉驁), and he eventually decided on his cousin. When the young couple got married, then-Crown Prince Ao loved his wife dearly. However, they had no children; then-Consort Xu miscarried a male child while her husband was crown prince, and would miscarry a female child when she later became empress, but she would have no births. She was described to have been, unlike even most noble women of the time, well-learned in literature and formal writing.

== As empress ==
In July 33 BC, then-Consort Xu's father-in-law Emperor Yuan died, and her husband Crown Prince Ao succeeded to the throne as Emperor Cheng. On 13 May 31 BC, he created her empress. He favored her greatly, but also had another favorite, Consort Ban, who also was childless. Because both the empress and Consort Ban lacked children, Emperor Cheng's mother Empress Dowager Wang Zhengjun became concerned, and she encouraged him to take on more and more concubines in the hopes of producing an imperial heir, but none would come.

Because of the relatively exclusive status that Empress Xu had with regard to Emperor Cheng's affection, the officials also began to become concerned about the lack of an imperial heir. In 28 BC, the Confucian scholar and astrologer Liu Gengsheng (劉更生, later named Liu Xiang 劉向) submitted a report that suggested that Empress Xu's power be reduced and that the emperor spread his affection to other concubines. In response, Emperor Cheng reduced the budget of the empress' palace. She filed a formal objection with her husband, to which he made a formal reply in the form of an edict upholding the reduction in expenditures. Nevertheless, it did not appear that their relationship was severely strained.

However, a decade later, Empress Xu would meet her downfall. Around 19 BC, when Emperor Cheng was visiting Princess Yang'a (陽阿公主), he became enamored with her dancing girl Zhao Feiyan and her younger sister Zhao Hede and made them his concubines, and they were favored over Empress Xu and Consort Ban. In late 18 BC, the Zhao sisters falsely accused Empress Xu and Consort Ban of witchcraft. On 8 January 17 BC, Empress Xu was deposed and put under house arrest in a subsidiary palace. Consort Ban was spared after successfully pleading her case, but she did not wish to return to the same environment and instead became a lady in waiting for Empress Dowager Wang.

== After removal as empress ==
Empress Xu was presumably still given the proper supplies as a former empress, but was distressed about the loss of her status and her freedom. Circa 10 BC, she made an attempt to better her situation. At that time, her sister Xu Mi, after the death of her husband Han Bao (韓寶), the Marquess of Long'e, carried on an affair with Emperor Cheng's powerful cousin Chunyu Zhang, who was well-trusted by Emperor Cheng and considered a possible successor to their uncle Wang Gen as the commander of the armed forces. Empress Xu asked her sister to ask Chunyu to intercede on her behalf, and she gave Chunyu many gifts. Her intent was to regain her freedom and again become an imperial consort—she was initially not hopeful of regaining her empress status. Chunyu, in order to continue to get gifts from her, deceived her and told her that he would try to have her made "left empress"—i.e., returned to empress status in an inferior role to Empress Zhao. Chunyu had no actual intentions to help her, however.

Chunyu himself was in trouble, however, in 8 BC. Wang Gen was ill at the time, and there was speculation that Chunyu would succeed him. Wang Gen's nephew Wang Mang (王莽), who also wanted to succeed Wang Gen, obtained information about Chunyu's corruption and reported the information to Wang Gen and Empress Dowager Wang, who became so angry that she had Emperor Cheng expel Chunyu from the imperial court and be returned to his march. Chunyu, before he left the capital, gave his horses and luxurious carts to his cousin Wang Rong (王融)—the son of his uncle Wang Li (王立), with whom he had a running feud. Wang Li, happy with Chunyu's gift, submitted a petition requesting that Chunyu be allowed to remain at the capital—which drew Emperor Cheng's suspicion because he knew of the feud between Wang Li and Chunyu. He ordered Wang Rong be arrested, and Wang Li, in his panic, ordered his son to commit suicide—which in turn caused Emperor Cheng to become even more suspicious. He therefore had Chunyu arrested and interrogated. Chunyu admitted to how he had deceived Empress Xu and received bribes from her, and he was executed. In the end, Emperor Cheng forced Empress Xu to commit suicide.

Chinese royalty
Preceded by Empress Wang Zhengjun	Empress of Western Han Dynasty; 13 May 31 – 8 Jan 17 BC	Succeeded by Empress Zhao Feiyan
