= Consort Ban =

Chinese scholar, poet, and writer (c. 48–6 BCE)

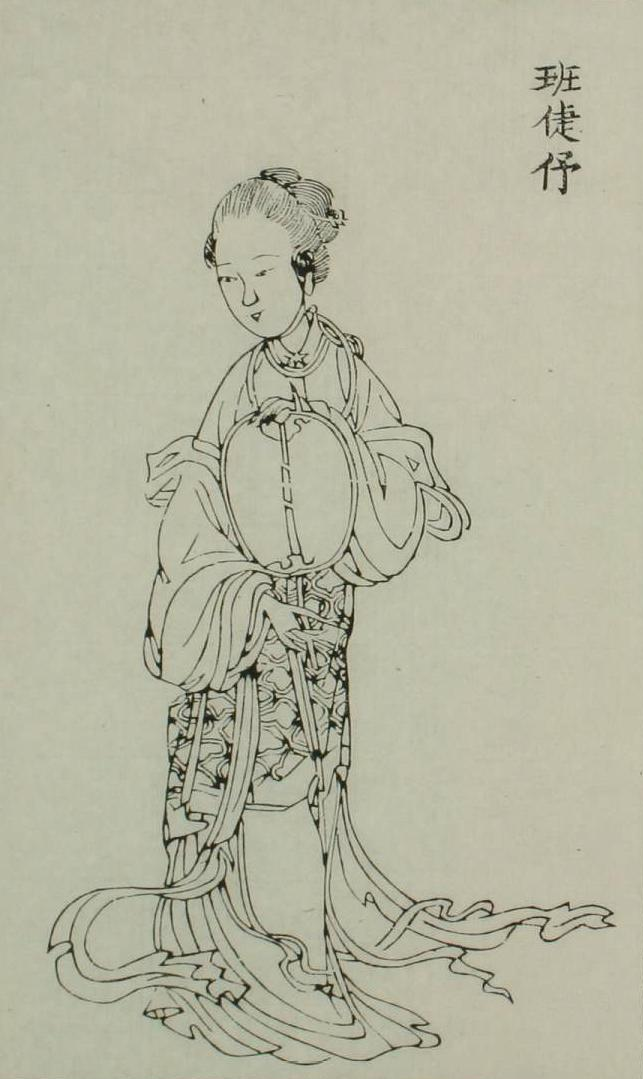
Ban Jieyu

Consort Ban (Note: The name Ban Tian is not recorded in historiographies) (c. 48 BCE – c. 6 BCE), or Ban Jieyu (Chinese: 班婕妤; pinyin: Bān Jiéyú; Wade–Giles: Pan Chieh-yü), also known as Lady Ban (Pan), was an imperial consort, Chinese scholar and poet during the Western Han dynasty (206 BCE – 23 CE). Jieyu (婕妤) was a title for a third-rank palace lady, one rank below Zhaoyi and two ranks below the Empress.

== Life ==
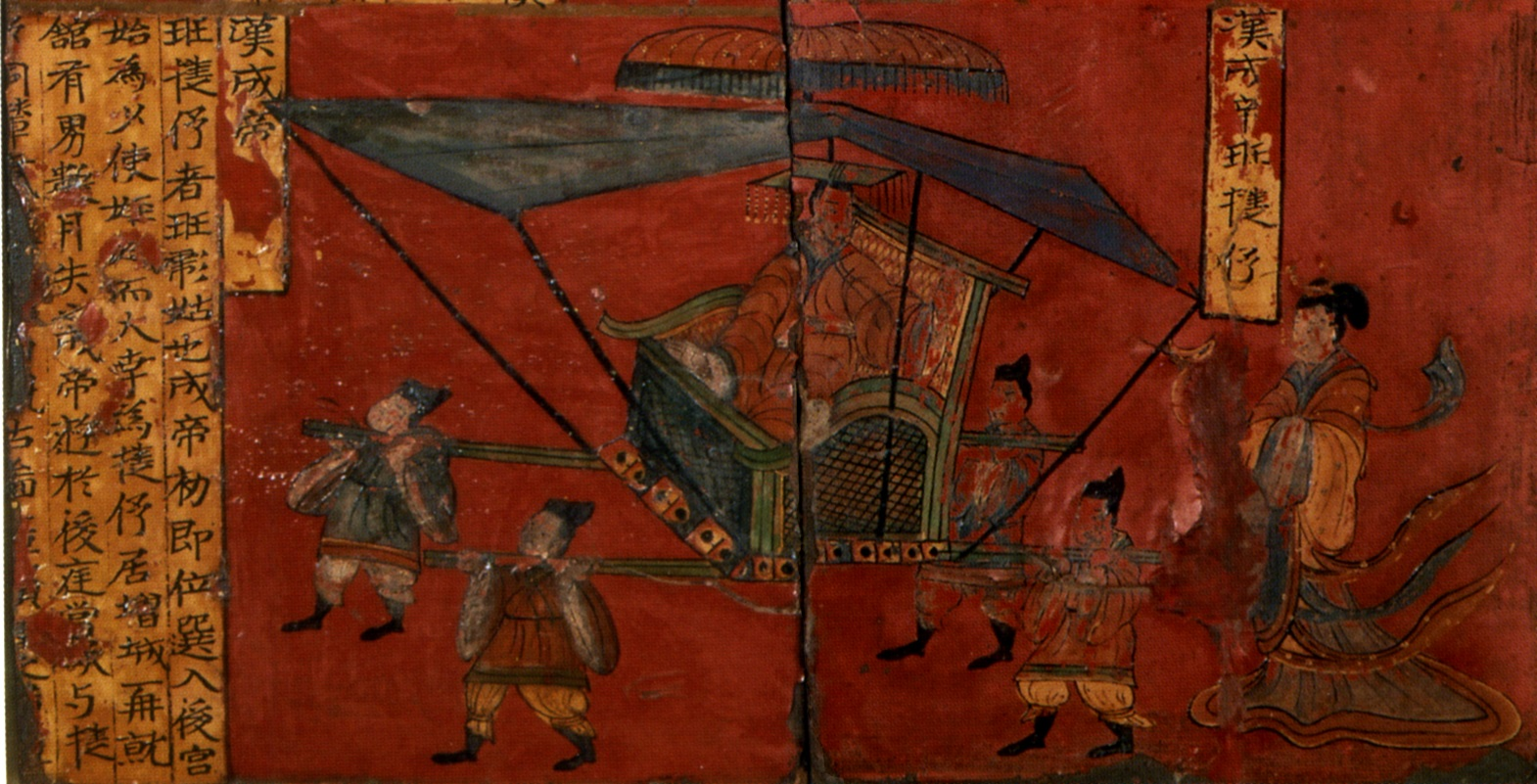
Consort Ban declining to ride with Emperor Cheng on his palanquin. The painting is from the bottom panel of a Northern Wei screen.

Consort Ban started as a junior maid, became a concubine of Emperor Cheng of Han, and quickly rose to prominence at court. She had two sons with him, but both died in infancy. Once she declined an invitation to ride in a palanquin because she feared to distract him from matters of state. She was also renowned as a great scholar, able to recite poems from the Shi Jing and a lot of other texts.

Because neither the Empress Xu nor Consort Ban produced Emperor Cheng an heir, the Empress Dowager Wang Zhengjun encouraged him to take more concubines. Around 19 BCE, however, the emperor took a liking to the dancing girl Zhao Feiyan and her sister Zhao Hede. They were both made concubines and he favored them over Empress Xu and Consort Ban. In 18 BCE both the Empress and Consort Ban were accused of witchcraft. Empress Xu was put under house arrest away from court, but Consort Ban pleaded her case. She used citations of Confucius and made a speech that impressed the emperor and he allowed her to stay at court. She then chose to become a lady in waiting to the Empress Dowager, instead of remaining consort to the Emperor. Consort Ban became part of the emperor's funeral park after his death on April 7 BCE and died a year later.

=== Family ===
Consort Ban once saved her brother Ban Zhi from a charge of treason. Ban Zhi was to become the father of the historian Ban Biao. Ban Biao, in turn, had a son and a daughter, Ban Gu and Ban Zhao, who would complete their father's historic work, Book of Han.

== Poems ==
She "is accredited with two fu poems" but is best known for the famous poem attributed to her ("Yuan Ge Xing" or "Song of Resentment"), in which she compares herself to a discarded autumn fan. It deals with her sorrow at having been abandoned by the Emperor and is written in the yuefu style of poetry. However, there is a certain historical doubt about the attribution of this song to her, especially since it is not mentioned in her grand-nephew Ban Gu's biography of her. The poems attributed to her, or written in her persona, have remained in circulation in the many centuries after her death.

== Inclusion in the Lienü zhuan ==
Her biography was included in the Confucian classic Biographies of Exemplary Women (Lienü Zhuan) compiled by the Han dynasty scholar Liu Xiang in 18 BCE. Consort Ban's biography is part of Scroll 9, titled Supplemental Biographies (新刊續列女傳).
