= Zhao Feiyan =

Empress of China from 16 to 7 BC

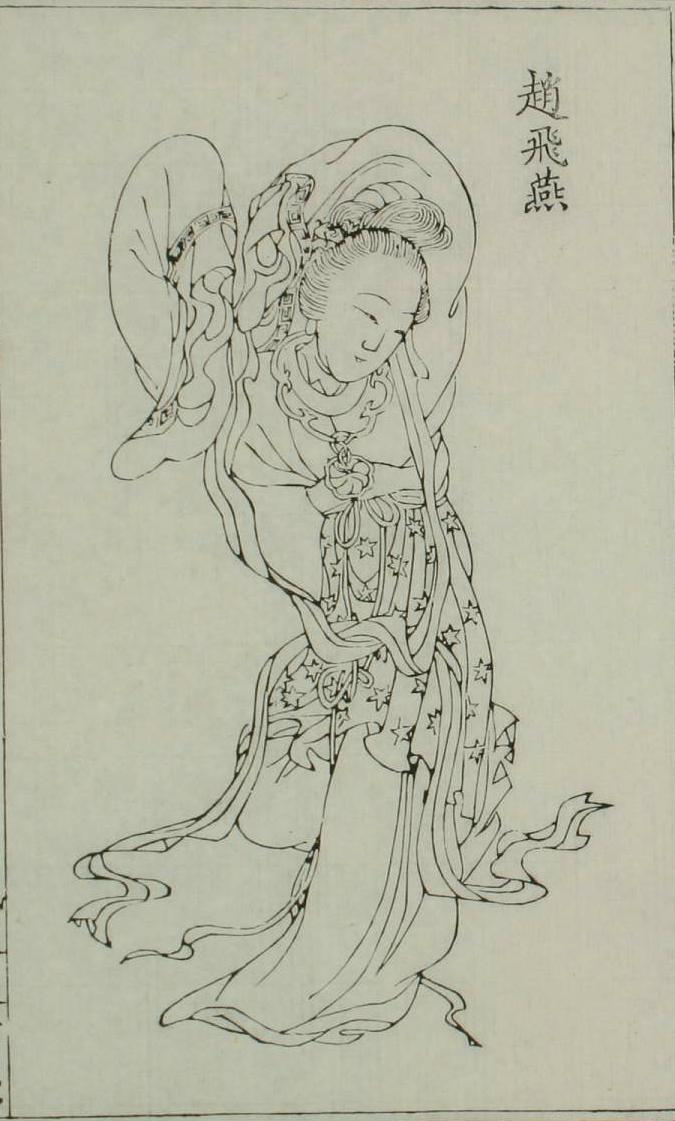

Empress consort of the Western Han dynasty
- Tenure: 13 July 16– April 7 BC
- Predecessor: Empress Xu
- Successor: Empress Fu

Empress Dowager of the Western Han Dynasy
- Tenure: April 7– August 1 BC
- Predecessor: Empress Dowager Wang
- Successor: None
- Born: 45? BC
- Died: 1 BC
- Spouse: Emperor Cheng of Han
Posthumous name
- Empress Xiaocheng 孝成皇后
- Occupation: courtesan, empress

Zhao Feiyan (simplified Chinese: 赵飞燕; traditional Chinese: 趙飛燕; pinyin: Zhào Fēiyàn, 45? BC – September or October 1 BC), formally Empress Xiaocheng (孝成皇后), was a Chinese courtesan and empress. She was an empress during the Han dynasty. Her husband was Emperor Cheng. She was known in the collective consciousness of Chinese society more for her beauty than for the regal presence that she and her sister, the Consort Zhao Hede engaged in and exuded, but unlike most of the famous beauties in Chinese history (such as the Four Beauties), she was often vilified by her own sisters. She was often contrasted with Yang Guifei, the concubine of Emperor Xuanzong of Tang, because she was known for her slender build while Yang was known for her full build. This led to the Chinese idiom huanfei yanshou (環肥燕瘦, literally "fat Huan, thin Fei"), describing the range of beauty types. Later, the idiom was applied to literary styles that could be either verbose or sparse, but equally effective.

== Early life ==
Zhao Feiyan’s birth year is assumed to be 45 BC. Historical accounts say her personal name was Yi Zhu (宜主). She was a daughter of two hereditary servants of imperial princes or princesses. It is said that when she was born, her parents were poor and that they abandoned her. Seeing that she was still alive after three days, they took her home and raised her. After her father died she and her sister were adopted by a housekeeper to a rich family. Their adoptive father's name was Zhao Lin (趙臨) and they took his surname.

When she grew up, she was assigned to the household of Princess Yang'a (陽阿公主), a sister of Emperor Cheng. She became a courtesan there and was given the name that she would become known by — Feiyan (literally, flying swallow) because when she danced she flew about like a flying swallow.

== Imperial consort to Cheng ==
Circa 19 BC, Emperor Cheng was visiting Princess Yang'a when he saw both her and her sister Hede, and he became enamored with them. He had both of them sent to his palace, and they became greatly favored imperial consorts, and they took his affection away from Empress Xu and Consort Ban. In 18 BC, they falsely accused Empress Xu and Consort Ban of witchcraft; Empress Xu was deposed, and while Consort Ban was able to successfully plead her case, she did not wish to return to the same environment and instead became a lady in waiting for Empress Dowager Wang. The Zhao sisters now dominated the palace.

Emperor Cheng wanted to make Feiyan the new empress, but Empress Dowager Wang complained about her low birth and prior occupation as a dancing girl. In 16 BC, she finally capitulated to her son's wishes, and in preparation, Emperor Cheng first made Feiyan's father Zhao Lin the Marquess of Chengyang, so that she would no longer be viewed as coming from low birth. On 13 July, she was made empress.

== Empress consort ==
After Feiyan was created empress, she began to lose favor from Emperor Cheng, while her sister Hede received the nearly exclusive affection of Emperor Cheng and acquired the title of "Zhaoyi" (second in rank; one lower rank than the Empress, which meant "concubine behind the Empress"). While the sisters initially were jealous of each other, they later reconciled. However, neither of them would produce any children who could serve as imperial heir—something greatly troubling to Emperor Cheng (whose earlier favorites Empress Xu and Consort Ban were also childless, and no other consort of whom was known to have had children). It was alleged that Empress Zhao, with her sister covering for her, often engaged in adulterous acts with men who were known to have fathered many children, in hopes of becoming pregnant.

Empress Zhao and her sister Hede would also be alleged to have been involved in something even more sinister around this period. Based on an investigative report later authored in 6 BC (after Emperor Cheng's death), Emperor Cheng had two sons—one born to Consort Cao in 12 BC and one born to Consort Xu (a relative of the deposed Empress Xu) in 11 BC. However, both of the sons were murdered in their infancy by orders of Consort Zhao Hede, with at least tacit agreement from Emperor Cheng; Consort Cao was forced to commit suicide after her son was murdered. The report further alleged that the Zhao sisters engaged in many tactics, such as forced abortions, assassinations, and poisonings, to make sure that no other concubine would bear an imperial heir.

In 9 BC, still heirless, Emperor Cheng appeared to come to the resolution of making either his younger brother Prince Liu Xing of Zhongshan (中山王劉興) or his nephew Prince Liu Xin of Dingtao his heir. Emperor Cheng became convinced that Prince Xin was more capable, and at the same time, Prince Xin's grandmother Consort Fu was endearing herself to Empress Zhao, her sister Hede, and Emperor Cheng's uncle Wang Gen with lavish gifts, and so the Zhaos and Wang Gen both praised Prince Xin as well. Emperor Cheng made Prince Xin crown prince on 20 March 8 BC.

== Empress dowager ==
Emperor Cheng died suddenly in April 7 BC, from an apparent stroke (historians also suggest the possibility of an overdose of aphrodisiacs given to him by Consort Zhao Hede). Immediately, rumors flew that he had had concubines who bore him sons, but that those sons and their mothers were murdered by Consort Zhao Hede (out of jealousy) and possibly Emperor Cheng himself. Grieving her husband and fearful of reprisals, Zhao Hede killed herself. Crown Prince Xin ascended the throne as Emperor Ai. Because the rumors largely centered around Hede and because of her role in Emperor Ai's becoming Emperor Cheng's heir, Empress Zhao was personally unscathed, and Emperor Ai honored her with the title of empress dowager. However, she would have little or no political influence during the reign of Emperor Ai.

After the investigative report commissioned by Grand Empress Dowager Wang was published in 6 BC, accusing Consort Zhao Hede of the atrocities against the other imperial consorts and their children (and implicitly, although not directly, accusing Empress Dowager Zhao of the same thing), Empress Dowager Zhao's family was exiled, and the marquess titles granted to her brother and nephew removed. However, Empress Dowager Zhao herself was spared, particularly because she was on friendly relations with Emperor Ai's domineering grandmother Consort Fu (who insisted on and received the title of grand empress dowager). Some of her relatives, instead of going into exile, were hidden by Grand Empress Dowager Wang's nephew Wang Ren (王仁), but after they were discovered, Wang was punished by being sent back to his march.

== Death ==
In August 1 BC, Emperor Ai died. In decisive action, Grand Empress Dowager Wang seized power back from Emperor Ai's favorite Dong Xian and made her nephew Wang Mang regent to the succeeding Emperor Ping. Wang Mang, who wanted to extinguish all dissent (and who previously bore a grudge against Emperor Ai for demoting him and extended that grudge to those who supported Emperor Ai) had Empress Dowager Zhao demoted from her position as empress dowager to the title of Empress Xiaocheng. A few months later, she was further demoted to a commoner and ordered to guard her husband's tomb. That day, she committed suicide.

== Inclusion in the Lienü zhuan ==
Her biography was included in the Confucian classic Biographies of Exemplary Women (Lienü Zhuan), compiled by the Han dynasty scholar Liu Xiang. Zhao Feiyan's biography is part of Scroll 9, titled Supplemental Biographies (新刊續列女傳).

== In popular culture ==
- She is portrayed as one of the antagonists in the 2008 Chinese television series "The Queens" by Tong Liya.
- Zhao is portrayed as one of the characters of the Chinese television series Love Weaves Through a Millennium, played by Niki Yi.

== Notes ==
Chinese royalty
Preceded by Empress Xu	Empress of Western Han dynasty 13 Jul 16– Apr 7 BC	Succeeded by Empress Fu
