= Wang Zhengjun =

Empress of China from 48 to 33 BC

- Empress Xiao Yuan

Empress consort of the Han Dynasty
- Tenure: 29 January 48 – 8 July 33 BC
- Predecessor: Empress Wang
- Successor: Empress Xu

Empress Dowager of the Western Han Dynasty
- Tenure: 14 August 33– 17 April 7 BC
- Predecessor: Empress Dowager Qiongcheng
- Successor: Empress Dowager Zhao (皇太后), Empress Dowager Ding (帝太后)

Grand Empress Dowager of the Western Han Dynasty
- Tenure: 17 April 7 BC – 3 February 6 AD
- Predecessor: Grand Empress Dowager Qiongcheng
- Successor: None
- Born: 71 BC; Yuancheng
- Died: 3 February 13 AD (aged 83)
- Spouse: Emperor Yuan of Han
- Issue: Emperor Cheng of Han
Names
- Family name: Wang 王 Given name: Zhengjun 政君 Titles 太子妃 Crown Princess (50–48 BC) 皇后 Empress (48–33 BC) 皇太后 Empress Dowager (33–7 BC) 太皇太后 Grand Empress Dowager (7 BC – 8 AD) 新室文母太皇太后 Grand Empress Dowager Wenwu of Xin Dynasty (8–13 AD)
Posthumous name
- Empress Xiaoyuan 孝元皇后
- Father: Wang Jin, Marquess of Yangping
- Mother: Li Qin

Wang Zhengjun (Chinese: 王政君; pinyin: Wáng Zhèngūn; 71 BC – 3 February 13 AD), officially Empress Xiaoyuan (孝元皇后), later and more commonly known as Grand Empress Dowager Wang, born in Yuancheng (modern Handan, Hebei), was an empress during the Western Han dynasty of China, who played important roles during the reigns of five successive Han emperors (her husband, son, two stepgrandsons, and stepgreat-grandnephew) and later (according to traditional historians, unwittingly) led to the usurpation of the throne by her nephew Wang Mang. She is largely viewed sympathetically by historians as an unassuming and benevolent if overly doting woman who suffered much in her long life, who tried to influence the empire as well as she could, and tried to use her power for the benefit of the empire, and who was not a party to her nephew's machinations, but whose failure, leading to the downfall of the Western Han Dynasty, was her overdependence on her clan (the Wangs).

== Early life ==
Wang was born the second daughter of Wang Jin, the then-Minister of Justice and Lady Li. Although she was one of 12 children, only Wang and two brothers were born to Lady Li. Her parents tried to find Wang a husband; her suitors expired before their plans came to fruition. One suitor was the Prince of Dongping, but he died before the marriage. After this, Wang dedicated herself to studying books and playing the guqin. At age 18, she entered the palace as a palace woman, in the service of one of the imperial concubines.

Consort Sima, the favorite consort of Crown Prince Liu Shi, died from an illness. Crown Prince Shi was grief-stricken, became ill, and refused to see any of his concubines. His father, Emperor Xuan, suggested that Empress Xiaoxuan select palace women to attend the crown prince, as all the crown prince's concubines were so disagreeable. Wang was one of the palace women presented to the crown prince, among five others. The crown prince selected Wang, allegedly solely by the fact that she was seated closest to him at the time of selection. Three years after, Wang gave birth to a male child, Ao, whereas none of the crown prince's previous concubines had.

== Empress consort ==
In January 48 BC, Emperor Xuan died, and Crown Prince Shi became emperor. He made Consort Wang empress on 12 April; her son was made heir apparent on 17 June 47 BC. Wang's father was created the Marquess of Yangping, a title later inherited by Empress Wang's brother Wang Feng (王鳳), who would later play a large role in government.

Emperor Yuan was a relatively non-womanizing emperor, but he did have two favorite concubines in addition to Empress Wang—Consort Fu (傅昭儀) and Consort Feng Yuan (馮昭儀), each of whom bore him one son. Empress Wang apparently tried to maintain a cordial relationship with both, and she was largely successful, at least as far as Consort Feng was concerned. However, a struggle between Empress Wang and Consort Fu for their sons' heir status would erupt.

As Crown Prince Ao grew older, Emperor Yuan became increasingly unhappy with his fitness as imperial heir and impressed with Consort Fu's son, Prince Liu Kang of Shanyang (山陽王劉康). Several incidents led to this situation. One happened in 35 BC, when Emperor Yuan's youngest brother Prince Liu Jing of Zhongshan (中山王劉竟) died, Emperor Yuan became angry when he felt that the teenage Crown Prince Ao was insufficiently grieving—particularly because Princes Ao and Jing were of similar age and grew up together as playmates—and showing insufficient respect to Prince Jing. Prince Ao's head of household Shi Dan (史丹), a relative of Emperor Yuan's grandmother and a senior official respected by Emperor Yuan, managed to convince Emperor Yuan that Crown Prince Ao was trying to stop Emperor Yuan himself from overgrieving, but the seed of dissatisfaction was sown.

As the princes further grew, several things further led to an endearment between Emperor Yuan and Prince Kang. They shared affection and skills in music—particularly in the playing of drums. Prince Kang also showed high intelligence and diligence, while Crown Prince Ao was known for drinking and womanizing. When Emperor Yuan grew ill circa 35 BC—an illness that he would not recover from—Consort Fu and Prince Kang were often summoned to his sickbed to attend to him, while Empress Wang and Crown Prince Ao rarely were. In his illness, apparently encouraged by Consort Fu, Emperor Yuan reconsidered whether he should make Prince Kang his heir instead. Only the intercession of Shi Dan led Emperor Yuan to cease those thoughts. When Emperor Yuan died in 33 BC, Crown Prince Ao ascended the throne (as Emperor Cheng).

== Empress dowager ==
After the death of Emperor Yuan and the accession of Emperor Cheng, Empress Wang became empress dowager. As Empress Dowager, Empress Wang became directly involved in politics and began to make decisions on state affairs. She gave her five surviving brothers vast territories within the Han empire. They became known as “The Five Vassals.” Thus, Empress Dowager Wang and her brothers were the true rulers of the empire, while the emperor remained a figurehead. They made all the decisions regarding the empire. Prince Kang, as was customary with imperial princes, was sent to govern his principality—now at Dingtao (定陶). Despite the near-coup by Consort Fu and Prince Kang, however, Empress Wang and Emperor Cheng did not bear grudges, and, against the advice of officials who were concerned that Prince Kang would become the subject of conspiracies, Emperor Cheng often summoned Prince Kang to the capital Chang'an for extended visits.

As empress dowager, Empress Dowager Wang was kind but overly doting on her son and her brothers. Emperor Cheng was very trusting of his uncles (Empress Dowager Wang's brothers) and put them in important roles in government. In addition to Wang Feng, who had inherited his father's title as the Marquess of Yangping, six of Empress Dowager Wang's brothers were created marquesses, in violation of the rule laid by Emperor Gao, the founder of the dynasty, who had decreed that only those who had contributed to the empire in substantial ways could be made marquesses. Several (Wang Feng, Wang Shang (王商), and Wang Gen (王根)), in addition to Empress Dowager Wang's cousin Wang Yin (王音), served successively as the supreme commander of the armed forces and were in effective control of the administration. After Wang Gen, Empress Dowager Wang's nephew Wang Mang served in the same role.

- Wang Feng, 33 BC–22 BC
- Wang Yin, 22 BC–15 BC
- Wang Shang, 15 BC–12 BC
- Wang Gen, 12 BC–8 BC
- Wang Mang, 8 BC–7 BC

The Wangs, while not corrupt in general and apparently genuinely trying to help the emperor, were largely concerned with aggrandizing their power and not with the best interests of the empire when selecting officials for various posts, and this led to a continued deterioration in the administration of Emperor Cheng, who at times considered modifying this power structure but always failed to do so. For example, in 24 BC, under the suggestion of an official Wang Zhang (王章, unrelated to the Wang clan), Emperor Cheng considered replacing Wang Feng with highly regarded official Feng Yewang (馮野王), the brother of his father's concubine Consort Feng. When Wang Feng realized this, Empress Dowager Wang became saddened, and in response Emperor Cheng executed Wang Zhang and relieved Feng Yewang of his post without any allegation of wrongdoing.

=== Succession issue ===
Emperor Cheng was a womanizer with many favorites. His first favorite was Empress Xu (created 31 BC), from the clan of his murdered grandmother, the first wife of Emperor Xuan. He also favored Consort Ban. Neither Empress Xu nor Consort Ban bore him a child, however, and concerned with having a grandson to be heir, Empress Dowager Wang openly encouraged Emperor Cheng to take on more and more concubines, but that did not result in the birth of an heir. Circa 19 BC, however, when Emperor Cheng was visiting the Princess of Yang'a (陽阿公主), he became enamored with her dancing girl Zhao Feiyan (趙飛燕) and her sister Zhao Hede (趙合德) and made them his concubines, and they became favored over Empress Xu and Consort Ban. In 18 BC, the Zhao sisters falsely accused Empress Xu and Consort Ban of practicing magic or witchcraft; Empress Xu was deposed, and while Consort Ban was able to successfully plead her case, she did not wish to return to the same environment and instead became a lady in waiting for Empress Dowager Wang. Emperor Cheng wanted to then create Zhao Feiyan as empress, but Empress Dowager Wang complained about her low birth and prior occupation as a dancing girl; she finally capitulated to her son's wishes in 16 BC, but she was never pleased with the Zhao sisters. Neither the Zhaos nor another later favorite of Emperor Cheng's, Consort Li, bore him a son either, however.

In 9 BC, still heirless, Emperor Cheng appeared to come to the resolution of making either his younger brother Prince Liu Xing of Zhongshan (中山王劉興) or his nephew Prince Liu Xin of Dingtao (定陶王劉欣, Prince Kang's son) his heir. Emperor Cheng became convinced that Prince Xin was more capable, and at the same time, Prince Xin's grandmother Consort Fu was endearing herself to the Zhaos and Wang Gen with lavish gifts, and so the Zhaos and Wang Gen both praised Prince Xin as well. Emperor Cheng made Prince Xin crown prince in 8 BC.

Emperor Cheng died suddenly in 7 BC, apparently from a stroke (although historians also report the possibility of an overdosage of aphrodisiacs given to him by Consort Zhao Hede). Immediately there were many rumors that he had in fact had concubines who bore him sons, but that those sons and their mothers were murdered by Consort Zhao Hede (out of jealousy) and possibly Emperor Cheng himself. Grieving her husband and apparently fearful of reprisal, Consort Zhao Hede killed herself. Crown Prince Xin ascended the throne as Emperor Ai.

A report by officials commissioned by Empress Dowager Wang concluded in 6 BC that Emperor Cheng did have two sons—one born to Consort Cao in 12 BC and one born to Consort Xu (a relative of the deposed Empress Xu) in 11 BC. However, both of the sons were murdered in their infancy by orders of Consort Zhao Hede, with at least tacit agreement from Emperor Cheng, who was enamored with her; Consort Cao was forced to commit suicide after her son was murdered. In response, apparently at the urging of Empress Dowager Wang, Emperor Ai stripped the Zhaos' relatives of their marquess titles and exiled them; only Empress Zhao Feiyan was spared (for the time being).

== Grand empress dowager ==
When Emperor Ai ascended the throne, Empress Dowager Wang received the title that she is later most known for—Grand Empress Dowager Wang. Initially, out of respect for her, Emperor Ai, while consolidating his own power base, left the Wangs, including Wang Mang, largely in the posts that they had been in.

However, the influences of Emperor Ai's grandmother Consort Fu would soon be shown. Consort Fu was not content with her title of Princess Dowager of Dingtao; rather, she also wanted to be empress dowager. Grand Empress Dowager Wang was willing to let her have the title, and it was by her edicts that Consort Fu was also given the title Grand Empress Dowager (with a difference—Fu had the unique title, not again to be used, of Ditaitaihou (帝太太后) compared with Wang's regular title of Taihuangtaihou (太皇太后)); in an analogous manner, Emperor Ai's mother Consort Ding was also given the title of Empress Dowager (Ditaihou, 帝太后; cf. Zhao Feiyan's title of Huangtaihou, 皇太后)).

Consort Fu was not content with titles, however, but did everything she could to control her grandson's administration. Part of her agenda involved the removal of the Wangs from government. Grand Empress Dowager Wang had no desire to contend with Fu, however, and voluntarily ordered members of the Wang family to resign and turn over power to the Fus and the Dings. Her humility and willingness to yield greatly impressed the people and the officials in government, and as the incompetence of Emperor Ai became apparent, the people and the officials—who were largely against the Wangs during the reign of Emperor Cheng—all clamored for the return of the Wangs. This yearning came partly from a thorough miscarriage of justice perpetrated by Consort Fu in 6 BC when she, still bearing a grudge from her struggles with her former romantic rival Consort Feng Yuan (who by that time was Princess Dowager of Zhongshan and the grandmother of Prince Liu Jizi of Zhongshan), falsely accused Consort Feng of practicing magic, forced her to commit suicide, and executed and exiled a large number of her family. In response, in 2 BC, Emperor Ai recalled Wang Mang to the capital to attend to Grand Empress Dowager Wang.

In 1 BC, Emperor Ai died without an heir, and this left the imperial household in immediate turmoil—during which Grand Empress Dowager Wang would play an important role.

== Wang Mang's usurpation ==
When Emperor Ai died, his male favorite (commonly believed to be homosexual lover) Dong Xian was in command of the armed forces and was the most powerful official in government, and there was great uncertainty what was going to happen next. It was at this time Grand Empress Dowager Wang would play the most crucial role in her life. She decided to immediately proceed to the imperial palace and seize the imperial seal, and announced that she would take over the administration (臨朝聽政制, linchao tingzheng zhi) and then quickly summon Dong. Her move caught Dong by surprise, and he was paralyzed and unable to act. Grand Empress Dowager Wang summoned Wang Mang to the palace as well and transferred the command of the imperial guard and the big and small government affairs from Dong to Wang Mang. Dong, fearful of what was going to happen next, killed himself.

Wang Mang immediately moved to remove all obstacles to power, but at the same time maintaining an appearance of faithfulness to the Han Dynasty. With Grand Empress Dowager Wang's assent, he removed the Fus and Dings from government, and without her knowledge, he dishonored Consort Fu's and Consort Ding's graves. Grand Empress Dowager Wang then summoned her remaining stepgrandson Prince Jizi to the throne, as Emperor Ping.

During Emperor Ping's reign, Wang Mang served as regent (亲政, Qīnzhèng), with Grand Empress Dowager Wang's support. When in her presence, he did everything he could to convince her of his faithfulness to the Han Dynasty and also flattered her, but at the same time continued to purge the government of potential enemies and getting his associates to use propaganda to create an aura of holiness about him. In 1, convinced of her nephew's faithfulness, Grand Empress Dowager Wang created him Duke of Anhan (安漢公, literally "Duke who made Han secure")—even though previously there had not been a single duke created in Han history. In 2, when selecting an empress for Emperor Ping, Grand Empress Dowager Wang initially ordered that girls from the Wang clan be excluded, but Wang Mang immediately mobilized a mass of petitioners to surround the palace, urging her to make his daughter empress. Grand Empress Dowager Wang relented and selected Wang Mang's daughter to be Emperor Ping's empress, and she was created as such in 4.

In 3, another major event happened that greatly increased Wang Mang's power. Wang Mang's son Wang Yu (王宇), dissatisfied with his father's dictatorial rule, conspired with Emperor Ping's maternal uncles, the Weis, against Wang Mang. When their conspiracy was discovered, Wang Mang had not only Wang Yu and the Weis (except Consort Wei) put to death, but also used this opportunity to accuse many actual or potential political enemies as being part of the conspiracy and to execute or exile them. This included even his own uncle Wang Li (王立), whom he forced to commit suicide by forging an edict from Grand Empress Dowager Wang, from whom he hid the truth (and instead told that Wang Li had died of an illness). Wang Mang made Grand Empress Dowager Wang feel as if she were in control of the situation, however, by arranging for her to periodically survey the areas around the capital Chang'an to reward people with money and goods and to visit orphans and widows. He also ingratiated himself to her by building an impressive temple for her husband Emperor Yuan.

In 5, Wang Mang poisoned Emperor Ping after becoming concerned that Emperor Ping was going to take vengeance for Wang Mang's executing of his uncles. He also began to lift the façade of faithfulness to the Han in Grand Empress Dowager Wang's presence, effectively forcing her to grant him the title of acting emperor (假皇帝) against her wishes and to approve his selection of Liu Ying, a great-great-grandson of Emperor Xuan, as the new emperor (as Emperor Ruzi). In 8, Wang Mang usurped the throne and established the Xin Dynasty. When he demanded that Grand Empress Dowager Wang turn over the imperial seal, she initially refused, but eventually relented.

== Reign of Wang Mang ==
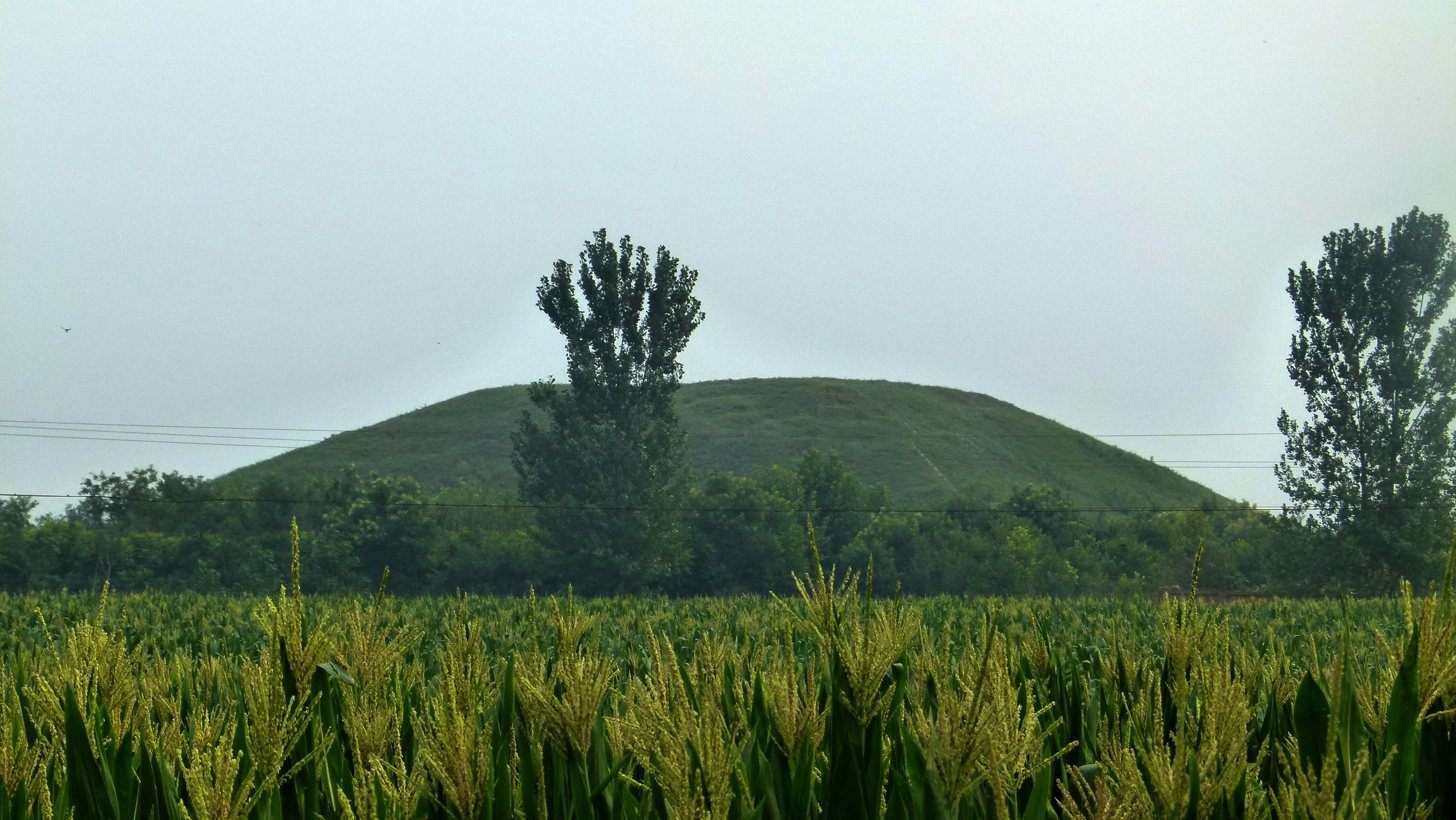
Tomb of Wang Zhengjun in Weiling (渭陵), Xianyang, Shaanxi

By obtaining the imperial seal for himself and refraining from issuing decisive orders on her behalf, Wang Mang was able to restrain the Grand Empress Dowager Wang's to some extent in the court's power play. Wang Mang initially wanted to abolish Grand Empress Dowager Wang's title and give her a new title that shows more power and majesty than before and only links her to his newly established dynasty and not to the Han, but she immediately indicated that she was greatly offended at his suggestion. In response, he kept her title but gave her an additional one—Wenmu (文母, The civilization mother), implying that she was a cofounder of his dynasty. Wang Mang did not fail to pay respect to his aunt and regularly sent her various precious gifts and frequently invited her to dinner or parties. She never acknowledged the new dynasty, and when Wang Mang changed the calendar and the holidays as well as the uniform of the imperial household attendants, she ordered her ladies in waiting to continue to observe the Han calendar and wear the Han uniforms. Wang Mang tried to more attend to her needs earnestly to try to please her, but his attempts failed, and he even freed him from any obedience or departure from his laws and orders, but it was useless.

Circa 12, Wang Mang destroyed Emperor Yuan's temple and built another more magnificent one, intended for Grand Empress Dowager Wang after her death. When she found out that her husband's temple had been destroyed, she was greatly saddened and cursed Wang Mang. From this period onwards, she was more than ever dissatisfied with Wang Mang and refused his invitations to dine with him and his parties, and refused to accept whenever he came to visit. She died in the spring of 13, and Wang Mang buried her, as was customary, in the same tomb as Emperor Yuan, but dug a trench between her and Emperor Yuan. In her honor, Wang Mang undertook a three-year period of mourning, during which he wore mourning clothes, visited her tomb, and made sacrifices to appease her soul.

== Family of Empress Wang ==
House of Liu

- Husband: Emperor Yuan of Han
  - Son: Emperor Cheng of Han ∞ Empress Xu & Empress Xiaocheng (Empress Dowager Zhao)
- Concubine of Husband: Consort Fu (Grand Empress Dowager Fu)
  - Liu Kang, Prince Gong of Dingtao ∞ Consort Ding (Empress Dowager Ding)
    - Liu Xin, Emperor Ai of Han ∞ Empress Xiaoai
- Concubine of Husband: Consort Feng Yuan (Princess Dowager Zhongshan)
  - Liu Xing, Prince Xiao of Zhongshan ∞ Consort Wei (Princess Dowager Zhongshan)
    - Liu Kan, Emperor Ping of Han ∞ Empress Xiaoping

House of Wang

- 1st Brother: Wang Feng, Marquess of Yangping
- 2nd Brother: Wang Man, Marquess Ai of Xindu
  - Wang Mang ∞ Empress Xiaomu
    - Empress Xiaoping ∞ Emperor Ping
- 3rd Brother: Wang Tan, Marquess An of Ping'a
- 4th Brother: Wang Chong, Marquess Gong of Ancheng
- 5th Brother: Wang Shang, Marquess Jincheng of Chengdu
- 6th Brother: Wang Li, Marquess Fang of Hongyang
- 7th Brother: Wang Jin, Marquess Yang of Quyang
- 8th Brother: Wang Fengshi, Marquess of Dai of Gaoping

Chinese royalty
Preceded by Empress Wang	Empress of Western Han Dynasty; 12 Apr 48– Jul 33 BC	Succeeded by Empress Xu
