= Zhao Hede =

Imperial consort to Han Emperor Cheng

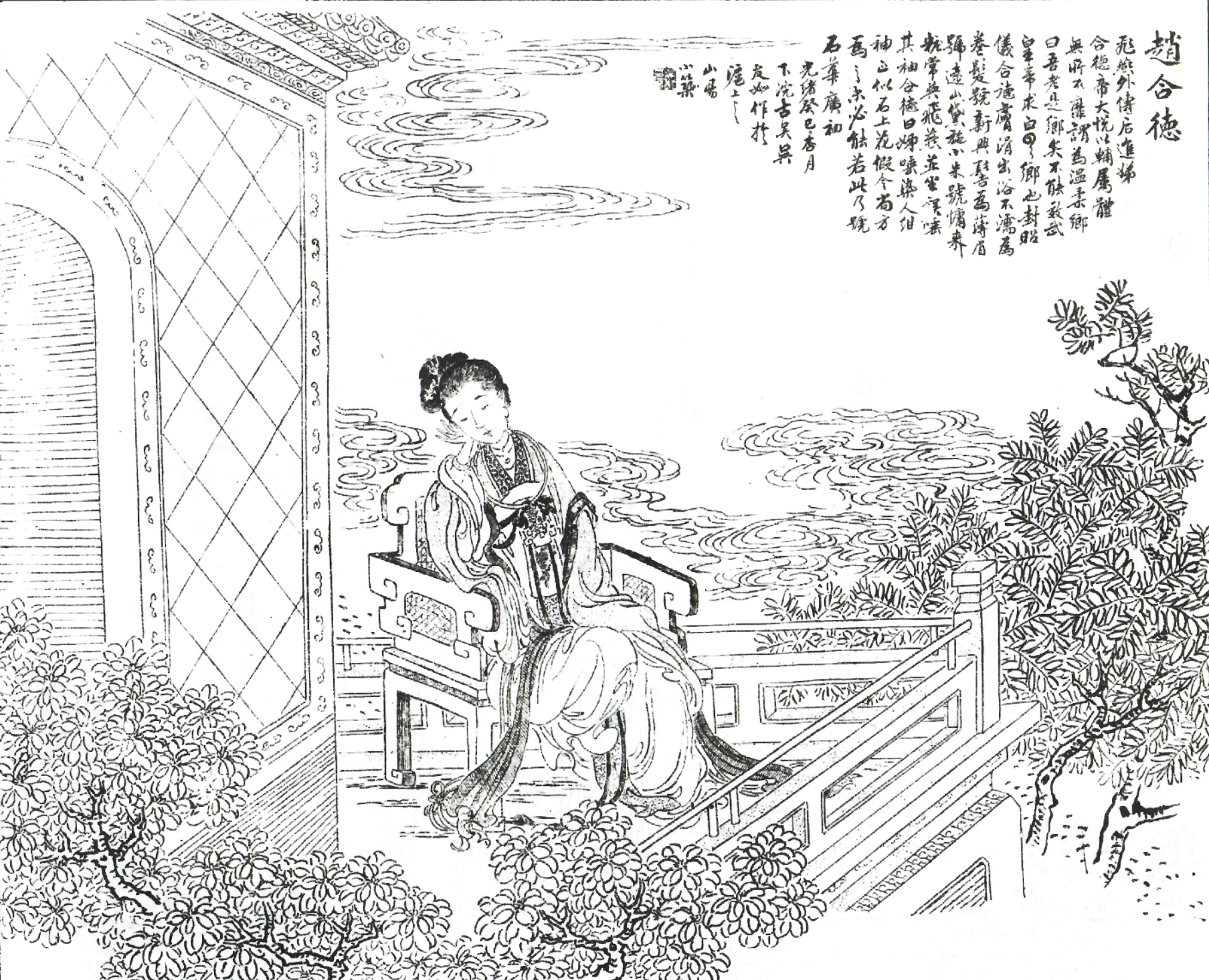
A Qing dynasty illustration of Zhao Hede

Zhao Hede (Chinese: 趙合德; died c.April 7 BC) was an imperial consort of the rank zhaoyi (昭儀) during the Han dynasty. She was a consort to Emperor Cheng and younger sister of the empress Zhao Feiyan.

== Background ==
It is not known when Zhao Hede was born, but it is clear she was younger than her sister Feiyan. According to historical accounts, she was a daughter of two hereditary servants of imperial princes or princesses. Her father's name was Zhao Lin (趙臨). She was probably later assigned to the household of Princess Yang'a (陽阿公主), with her sister Zhao Feiyan, but that is not clear. What is clear is that when Emperor Cheng became enamored with her sister circa 19 BC, he took not only her sister, but also her, as imperial consorts, and they became highly favored, over Empress Xu and Consort Ban.

== Imperial Consort ==
In 18 BC, they falsely accused Empress Xu and Consort Ban of witchcraft; Empress Xu was deposed, and while Consort Ban was able to successfully plead her case, she did not wish to return to the same environment and instead became a lady in waiting for Empress Dowager Wang. The Zhao sisters now dominated the palace. Feiyan was created empress in 16 BC.

After Feiyan was created empress; despite having the most outstanding and highest power a woman can have, and the first and unrivaled position in the emperor harem and the control of the imperial palace, she began to lose favor from Emperor Cheng; while her sister Hede acquired the eminent title of “Zhaoyi” (second in rank; one lower rank than the Empress, which meant “the concubine behind the Empress”), and received the nearly exclusive affection and proximity of Emperor Cheng. While the sisters initially were jealous of each other, they later reconciled, and continued to dominate the palace together. However, neither of them would produce any children who could serve as imperial heir—something greatly troubling to Emperor Cheng (whose earlier favorites Empress Xu and Consort Ban were also childless, and no other consort of whom was known to have had children).

Emperor Cheng so attached and loved Consort Zhao that the palace she lived in, Zhaoyang Palace (昭陽宮), was described in this way in the Book of Han:

The atrium of the palace was painted entirely scarlet red, while the bedchambers were painted black. The thresholds were made of copper, and were covered with gold. The steps were carved from white jade, and the edge of the walls were largely trimmed with gold, and the palace was decorated with jade produced in Lantian (藍田, in modern Xi'an, Shaanxi), pearls, and feather-like crystallized jade. Ever since there were imperial palaces, there has never been one so luxurious.

Consort Zhao was also described to have been so perfect in her beauty that when she arrived at the palace, every person who saw her could not stop praising her beauty. A senior lady in waiting to Emperor Cheng's grandfather Emperor Xuan named Chuofang Cheng (淖方成), however, commented: "She is water of disaster, and will surely put out the fire!" (A symbol of the Han dynasty is fire, so Chuofang was expressing her belief that Consort Zhao would lead to the destruction of the Han dynasty. The term that Chuofang used, huoshui (禍水), later became idiomatic to describe a woman who would lead to disaster, and is often extended to a longer form hongyan huoshui (红颜禍水) to describe women who were, fairly or not, viewed as the cause of their dynasties' destruction.)

== Palace Intrigues ==
Consort Zhao and her sister Empress Zhao would also be alleged to have been involved in something even more sinister around this period. Based on an investigative report later authored in 6 BC (after the deaths of Emperor Cheng and Consort Zhao herself), Emperor Cheng had two sons—one born to Consort Cao in 12 BC and one born to Consort Xu (a relative of the deposed Empress Xu) in 11 BC. However, both of the sons were murdered in their infancy by orders of Consort Zhao, with at least tacit agreement from Emperor Cheng; Consort Cao was forced to commit suicide after her son was murdered. The report further alleged that the Zhao sisters engaged in many tactics, such as forced abortions, assassinations, and poisonings, to make sure that no other concubine would bear an imperial heir.

Emperor Cheng died suddenly in April 7 BC, apparently from a stroke. His death took place at the residence of Consort Zhao (although historians also report the possibility of an overdose of aphrodisiacs given to him by Consort Zhao). Immediately, there were many rumors that he had in fact had concubines who bore him sons, but that those sons and their mothers were murdered by Consort Zhao (out of jealousy) and possibly Emperor Cheng himself. On behalf of Empress Dowager Wang, Emperor Cheng's mother, accused Zhao Hede of killing her son the Emperor Cheng, and ordered an investigation into the matter and the removal of all Zhaos except Empress Zhao, who was honored as Empress Dowager. Grieving over the death of her husband, upset at the loss of her status and wealth and apparently fearful of reprisal, Consort Zhao Hede killed herself.
