= Emperor Cheng of Han =

Emperor of Han China from 33 BC to 7 BC

Emperor Cheng of Han 漢成帝
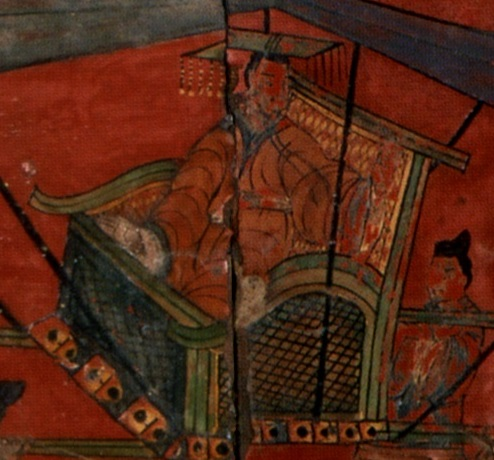
- Emperor Cheng riding a palanquin, Northern Wei painted screen (5th century)

Emperor of the Han dynasty
- Reign: 4 August 33 BC–17 April 7 BC
- Predecessor: Emperor Yuan
- Successor: Emperor Ai
- Born: 51 BC; Chang'an, Han Empire
- Died: 17 April 7 BC (aged 44); Chang'an, Han Empire
- Burial: Yan Mausoleum (延陵)
- Consorts: Empress Xu; Empress Xiaocheng
Names
- Family name: Liu (劉); Given name: Ao (驁)
Posthumous name
- Emperor Xiaocheng (孝成皇帝) "filial and successful"
- House: Liu
- Dynasty: Han (Western Han)
- Father: Emperor Yuan
- Mother: Empress Xiaoyuan

Emperor Cheng of Han
- Traditional Chinese: 漢成帝
- Simplified Chinese: 汉成帝
- Literal meaning: The Accomplished Emperor of Han
Transcriptions
Standard Mandarin
- Hanyu Pinyin: Hàn Chéngdì
- Wade–Giles: Han Ch'eng-ti
Yue: Cantonese
- Yale Romanization: Hon Sìhng-dai
- Jyutping: Hon3 Sing4 dai3
Southern Min
- Hokkien POJ: Hàn Sîng-tè

Alternative Chinese name
- Traditional Chinese: 劉驁
- Simplified Chinese: 刘骜
- Literal meaning: (personal name)
Transcriptions
Standard Mandarin
- Hanyu Pinyin: Liú Ào
- Wade–Giles: Liu Ao
Yue: Cantonese
- Yale Romanization: Làuh Ngòuh
- Jyutping: Lau4 Ngou4
Southern Min
- Hokkien POJ: Lâu Gô

Emperor Cheng of Han, personal name Liu Ao (劉驁; 51 BC – 17 April 7 BC), was the 12th emperor of the Chinese Han dynasty ruling from 33 until 7 BC. He succeeded his father, Emperor Yuan. Under Emperor Cheng, the Han dynasty continued its growing disintegration as the emperor's maternal relatives from the Wang clan increased their grip on the levers of power and on governmental affairs as encouraged by the previous emperor. Corruption and greedy officials continued to plague the government and, as a result, rebellions broke out throughout the country. Emperor Cheng died childless after a reign of 26 years; both of his sons by concubines had died in infancy. One of them starved to death and another was suffocated in prison. The babies and their mothers were killed by the order of Emperor Cheng's favorite consort Zhao Hede, with the implied consent of the emperor. He was succeeded by his nephew, Emperor Ai, whose death was followed by Wang Mang's rise to power.

== Birth and career as Crown Prince ==
Emperor Cheng was born circa 51 BC to then-Crown Prince Liu Shi (later Emperor Yuan) and one of his consorts, Consort Wang (later more commonly known as Grand Empress Dowager Wang Zhengjun). He was Emperor Yuan's first-born son.

On 17 June 47 BC, Emperor Yuan created him Crown Prince Ao.

Emperor Yuan had two favourite concubines in addition to Empress Wang, Consort Fu and Consort Feng Yuan, each of whom bore him one son. Empress Wang apparently tried to maintain a cordial relationship with both women, and she was largely successful, at least as far as Consort Feng was concerned. However, a struggle between Empress Wang and Consort Fu for their sons' status as heir to Emperor Yuan did erupt.

As Crown Prince Ao grew older, Emperor Yuan became increasingly unhappy with Ao's fitness as imperial heir and increasingly impressed with Consort Fu's son, Prince Kang of Dingtao (山陽王劉康). Several incidents led to this situation. One incident happened in 35 BC, when Emperor Yuan's youngest brother Prince Liu Jing of Zhongshan (中山王劉竟) died. Emperor Yuan became angry when he felt that the teenage Crown Prince Ao was insufficiently grieving—particularly because Princes Ao and Jing were of similar age and grew up together as playmates—and was showing insufficient respect towards Prince Jing. Prince Ao's head of household Shi Dan (史丹), a relative of Emperor Yuan's grandmother and a senior official respected by Emperor Yuan, managed to convince Emperor Yuan that Crown Prince Ao was trying to stop Emperor Yuan himself from grieving too much, but the seed of dissatisfaction was sown.

As the princes further grew older, Emperor Yuan and Prince Kang became closer. They shared an affection for, and skills in music, particularly in the playing of drums. Prince Kang also showed high intelligence and diligence, while Crown Prince Ao was known for drinking and womanizing. When Emperor Yuan became seriously ill (c. 35 BC), Consort Fu and Prince Kang were often summoned to his sickbed to attend to him, while Empress Wang and Crown Prince Ao rarely were. During his illness, Emperor Yuan considered whether he should make Prince Kang his heir instead (apparently encouraged by Consort Fu) . Only the intercession of Shi Dan led Emperor Yuan to cease those thoughts. When Emperor Yuan died in 33 BC, Crown Prince Ao ascended the throne (as Emperor Cheng).

== The growing power of the Wang clan ==
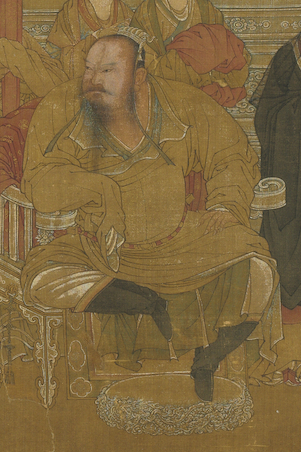
Emperor Cheng of Han

After the death of Emperor Yuan and the accession of Emperor Cheng, Empress Wang became empress dowager. Prince Kang, as was customary with imperial princes, was sent to govern his principality in Dingtao (定陶). Despite the attempts by Consort Fu and Prince Kang to gain the throne prior to Emperor Yuan's death, Empress Wang and Emperor Cheng did not bear grudges, and, against the advice of officials who were concerned that Prince Kang would become the subject of conspiracies, Emperor Cheng often summoned Prince Kang to the capital Chang'an for extended visits.

This was a period of increasingly heavy rains and the 29 BC Yellow River flood burst the stone Jin Dyke (金堤) between Shandong and Henan, prompting such outrage that the chancellor Yin Zhong (尹忠) felt obliged to commit suicide for the disgrace.

Emperor Cheng trusted of his uncles (Empress Dowager Wang's brothers) and put them in important roles in the government. In addition to his oldest uncle Wang Feng (王鳳), who had inherited his father's title as the Marquess of Yangping, six of Empress Dowager Wang's brothers were created marquesses, in violation of the rule laid by Emperor Gao, the founder of the dynasty, who had decreed that only those who had contributed to the empire in substantial ways could be made marquesses. Wang Feng, Wang Shang (王商) and Wang Gen (王根)), in addition to Empress Dowager Wang's cousin Wang Yin (王音), served successively as the supreme commander of the armed forces and were in effective control of the administration. After Wang Gen, Empress Dowager Wang's nephew Wang Mang served in the same role:

- Wang Feng, 33–22 BC
- Wang Yin, 22–15 BC
- Wang Shang, 15–12 BC
- Wang Gen, 12–8 BC
- Wang Mang, 8–7 BC

The Wangs, while not particularly corrupt and apparently some of them were genuinely trying to help the emperor, but many of them were more concerned about increasing their governmental power and did not have the best interests of the empire when they were selecting officials for various position in the government. This led to a continued deterioration in Emperor Cheng's administration of the empire, who at times considered modifying this power structure but always failed to do so. For example, in 24 BC, based on suggestions from an official, Wang Zhang (王章, unrelated to the Wang clan), Emperor Cheng considered replacing Wang Feng with the highly regarded official Feng Yewang (馮野王), the brother of his father's concubine Consort Feng. When Wang Feng realized this, Empress Dowager Wang became upset and, in response, Emperor Cheng executed Wang Zhang and relieved Feng Yewang of his position without any allegation of wrongdoing.

== The need for an heir for Emperor Cheng ==
Emperor Cheng had many favourites among his consorts. His first favourite was Empress Xu (created 31 BC), from the clan of his murdered grandmother, the first wife of Emperor Xuan. He favoured Consort Ban as well. Neither Empress Xu nor Consort Ban bore him a child. He also had a male favorite, Zhang Fang, upon whom he lavished a great deal of wealth. Focused on the need for Emperor Cheng to have a son to be heir, Empress Dowager Wang openly encouraged Emperor Cheng to take on more concubines, but that did not result in the birth of an heir. She also framed Zhang Fang for a crime to exile him from the capital, but the Emperor and his favorite maintained contact through letters, and Fang was even further promoted.

In c. 19 BC, when Emperor Cheng was visiting Princess Yanga (陽阿公主), he became enamoured with her dancing girl Zhao Feiyan (趙飛燕) and her sister Zhao Hede (趙合德) and made them his concubines, and they became favoured over Empress Xu and Consort Ban. In 18 BC, the Zhao sisters falsely accused Empress Xu and Consort Ban of witchcraft. As a result, Empress Xu was deposed. While Consort Ban was able to successfully plead her case, she did not wish to return to the same environment and instead became a lady in waiting for Empress Dowager Wang. Then Emperor Cheng wanted to make Zhao Feiyan his empress, but Empress Dowager Wang complained about her low birth and prior occupation as a dancing girl. However, she finally gave in to her son's wishes in 16 BC, but she never liked the Zhao sisters. Despite this, neither of the Zhao women nor another favourite of Emperor Cheng's, Consort Li, bore him a son.

In 9 BC, still without an heir, Emperor Cheng appeared to come to the resolution of making either his younger brother Prince Liu Xing of Zhongshan (中山王劉興) or his nephew Prince Liu Xin of Dingtao (定陶王劉欣, son of the late Prince Kang) his heir. Emperor Cheng became convinced that Prince Xin was more capable, and at the same time, Prince Xin's grandmother Consort Fu was endearing herself to the Zhaos and Wang Gen with lavish gifts, and so the Zhaos and Wang Gen both praised Prince Xin as well. Emperor Cheng made Prince Xin crown prince in 8 BC.

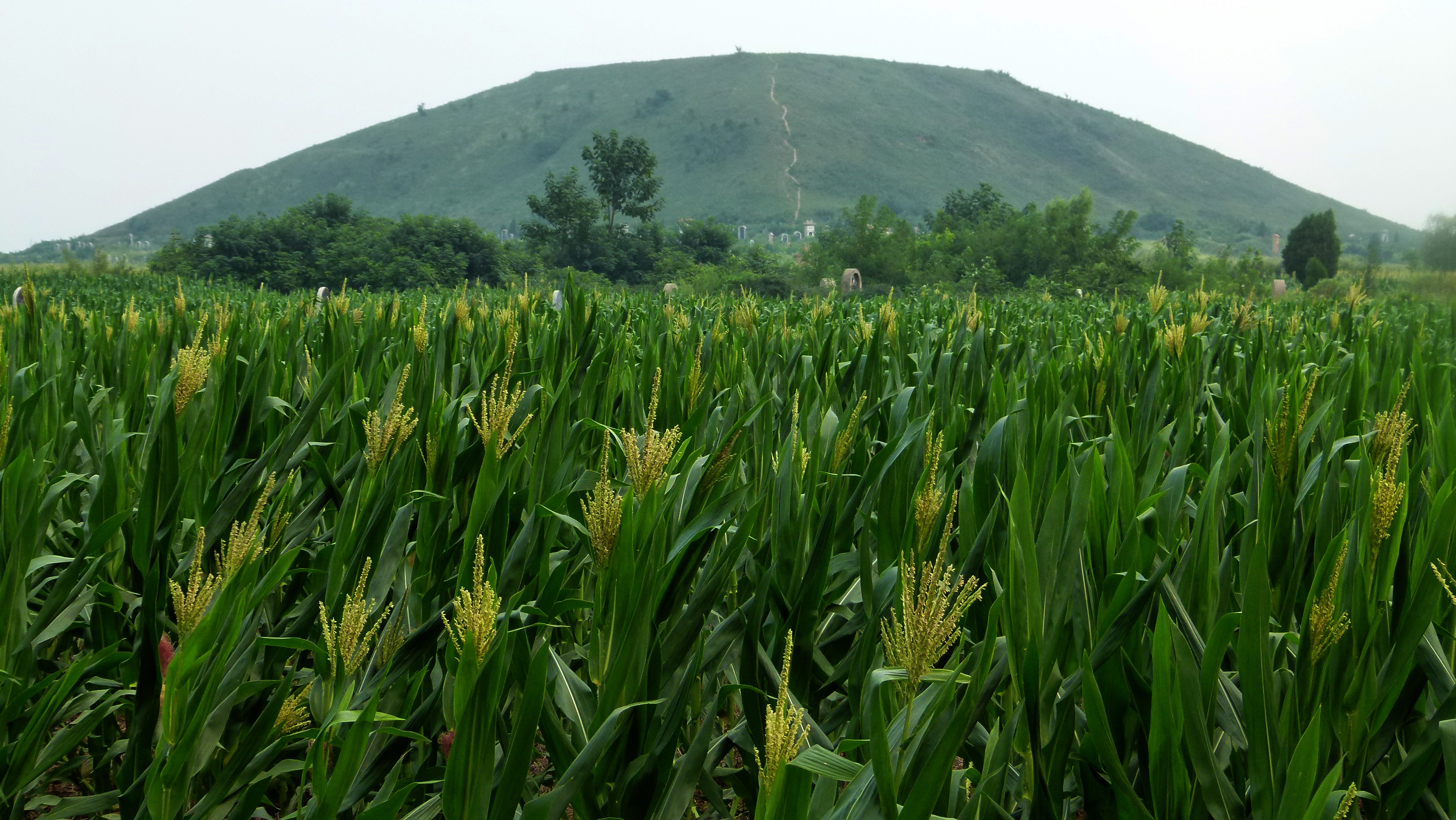
Yanling (延陵), tomb of Emperor Cheng, in Xianyang, Shaanxi

Emperor Cheng died suddenly in 7 BC, apparently from a stroke (although historians also report the possibility of an overdose of aphrodisiacs given to him by Consort Zhao Hede).

Immediately after his death, there were many rumours that he had in fact had concubines who bore him sons, but that those sons and their mothers were murdered by Consort Zhao Hede (out of jealousy) and she had possibly also murdered Emperor Cheng. Grieving for her husband and apparently fearful of reprisals, Consort Zhao Hede killed herself. Crown Prince Xin ascended the throne as Emperor Ai.

A report by officials commissioned by Empress Dowager Wang concluded in 6 BC that Emperor Cheng did have two sons—one born to Consort Cao in 12 BC and one born to Consort Xu (a relative of the deposed Empress Xu) in 11 BC. However, one of the sons was murdered in their infancy by orders of Consort Zhao Hede, with at least the tacit agreement from Emperor Cheng. Consort Cao was forced to commit suicide after her son was murdered. In response, apparently at the urging of Empress Dowager Wang, Emperor Ai stripped the Zhaos' relatives of their marquess titles and exiled them; only Empress Zhao Feiyan was spared, although she was forced to commit suicide after Emperor Ai's death.

== Era names ==
- Jianshi (建始) 32–28 BC
- Heping (河平) 28–25 BC
- Yangshuo (陽朔) 24–21 BC
- Hongjia (鴻嘉) 20–17 BC
- Yongshi (永始) 16–13 BC
- Yuanyan (元延) 12–9 BC
- Suihe (綏和) 8–7 BC

== Family ==
- Empress, of the Xu clan (皇后 許氏; d. 8 BC), second cousin once removed, personal name Kua (誇)
  - Unnamed miscarried son
  - Unnamed miscarried daughter
- Empress Xiaocheng, of the Zhao clan (孝成皇后 趙氏; 45–1 BC), personal name Feiyan (飞燕)
- Zhaoyi, of the Zhao clan (昭儀 趙氏; 39–7 BC), personal name Hede (合德)
- Jieyu, of the Wei clan (婕妤 卫氏)
- Meiren, of the Wang clan (美人王氏)
  - Unborn child
- Jieyu, of the Ban clan (婕妤 班氏; 48 BC – 6 BC), personal name Tian (恬)
- Meiren, of the Xu clan (美人 許氏; d. 11 BC)
  - Unnamed son (11 BC)
- Lady, of the Cao clan (宮人 曹氏; d. 12 BC)
  - Unnamed son (12 BC)

== See also ==
- Family tree of the Han dynasty

Emperor Cheng of Han House of Liu Born: 51 BC Died: 7 BC
Regnal titles
Preceded by Emperor Yuan of Han	Emperor of China; Western Han; 33–7 BC	Succeeded by Emperor Ai of Han
