= Timeline of the Han dynasty =

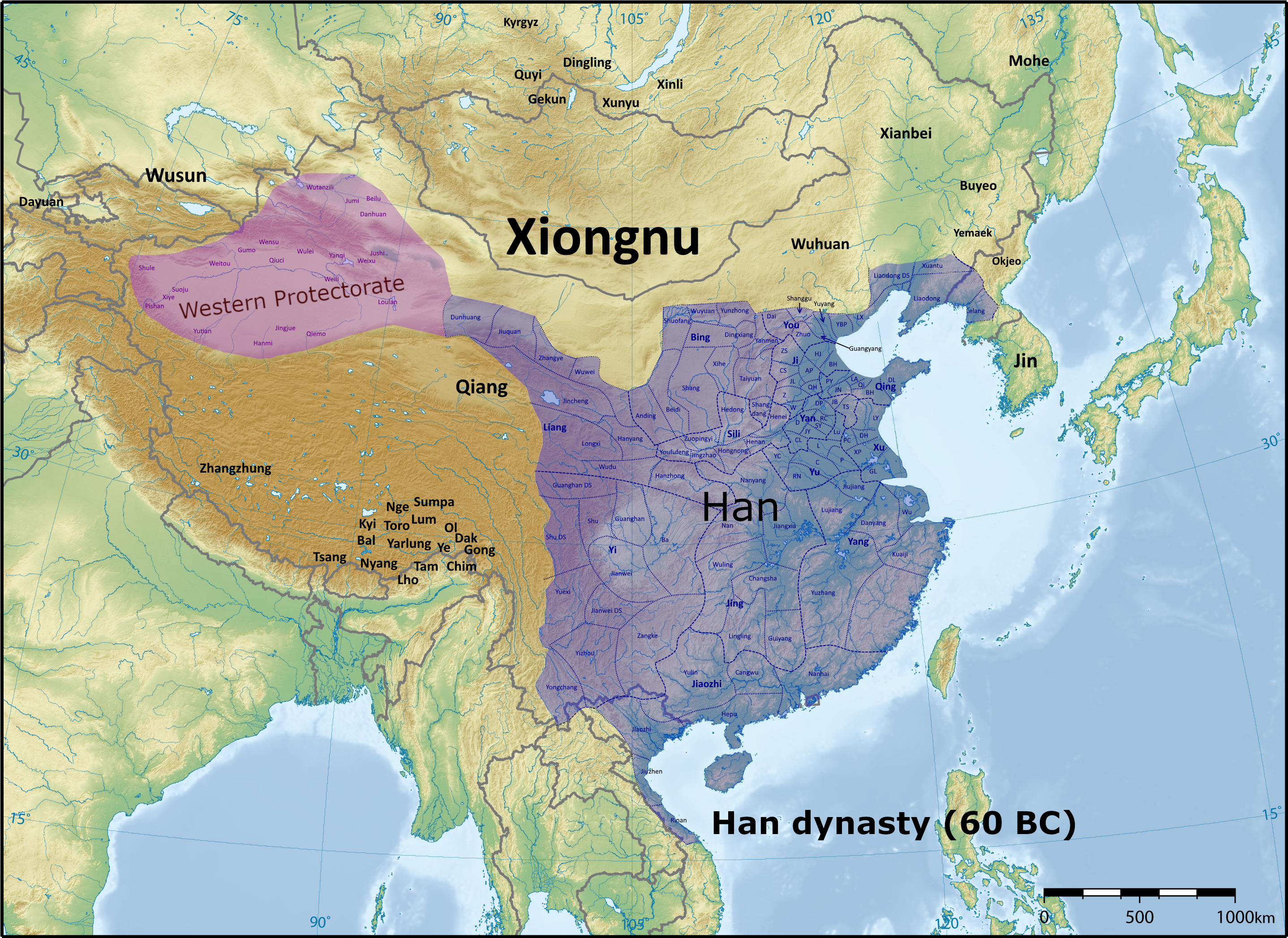
Han dynasty (60 BC)

This is a timeline of the Han dynasty (206 BC–220 AD) of Imperial China.

== 3rd century BC ==
Year	Date	Event
202 BC	28 February	Liu Bang becomes emperor of the Han dynasty (posthumously known as Emperor Gaozu of Han)
202 BC		Emperor Gaozu of Han moves the capital from Luoyang to Chang'an
201 BC		Battle of Baideng: Emperor Gaozu of Han's army is defeated by the Xiongnu
201 BC		Xin, King of Han defects to the Xiongnu

== 2nd century BC ==
=== 200s BC ===
Year	Date	Event
197 BC		The Xiongnu invade Dai Commandery with the help of Chen Xi and Han Xin
196 BC		Emperor Gaozu of Han replaces nine of the ten Kings of the Han dynasty with his brothers and sons
196 BC		The Xiongnu invade Dai Commandery with the help of Han Xin
195 BC	1 June	Emperor Gaozu of Han dies and is succeeded by Liu Ying (posthumously Emperor Hui of Han)
195 BC		The Xiongnu invade You Province with the help of Lu Wan

=== 190s BC ===
Year	Date	Event
188 BC		Emperor Hui of Han dies and is succeeded by Liu Gong (posthumously Emperor Qianshao of Han)
184 BC		Emperor Qianshao of Han dies and is succeeded by Liu Hong (posthumously Emperor Houshao of Han)
182 BC		The Xiongnu invade Longxi Commandery and Tianshui
181 BC		Nanyue invades Changsha
181 BC		The Xiongnu invade Longxi Commandery

=== 180s BC ===
Year	Date	Event
180 BC		Lü Clan Disturbance: Empress Lü dies and her clan is slaughtered
180 BC		Emperor Houshao of Han is deposed and succeeded by Liu Heng (posthumously Emperor Wen of Han)
179 BC		Earliest archaeological evidence of paper
179 BC		The Xiongnu invade Yunzhong Commandery
177 BC		The Xiongnu invade Ordos
176 BC		The kingdoms of Liang, Zhao, Qi, Dai, and Huainan are split up

=== 170s BC ===
Year	Date	Event
169 BC		The Xiongnu raid Han
166 BC		A 140,000 strong Xiongnu force invade near Chang'an

=== 160s BC ===
Year	Date	Event
160 BC		A system of beacon and lookout stations is deployed
158 BC		A 30,000 strong Xiongnu force attacks Yunzhong Commandery and Dai Commandery
157 BC		Emperor Wen of Han dies and is succeeded by Liu Qi (posthumously Emperor Jing of Han)
154 BC		Rebellion of the Seven States: Liu Pi and six other kings rebel but are defeated

=== 150s BC ===
Year	Date	Event
148 BC		The Xiongnu attack Yan Province
144 BC		The Xiongnu raid Yanmen Pass for horses
142 BC		The Xiongnu attack Yanmen Pass
141 BC		Emperor Jing of Han dies and is succeeded by Liu Che (posthumously Emperor Wu of Han)

=== 140s BC ===
Year	Date	Event
139 BC		Zhang Qian sets off for the Western Regions
136 BC		Official posts are created for academicians
135 BC		Han campaigns against Minyue: A puppet king is installed in Minyue
133 BC	June	Battle of Mayi: The Han army fails to ambush the Xiongnu
132 BC		Yellow River dikes burst

=== 130s BC ===
Year	Date	Event
129 BC		Han forces (40,000) under Wei Qing, Gongsun Ao, Gongsun He, and Li Guang engage in combat with the Xiongnu
128 BC		The Xiongnu attack Liaoxi and engage in combat with Han forces (40,000) under Wei Qing and Li Xi
128 BC		Nan Lü of Dongye surrenders to Han and the Canghai Commandery is created
127 BC		The Xiongnu raid Liaoxi and Yanmen
127 BC		Han forces under Wei Qing, Hao Xian, and Li Xi plunder the Xiongnu for livestock
126 BC		The Canghai Commandery is abandoned
126 BC		The Xiongnu army (900,000) raids Han territory
123-124 BC		Han forces (100,000) under Wei Qing attack the Xiongnu
122 BC		The Prince of Huainan rebels and is defeated
122 BC		The Xiongnu raid Shanggu
121 BC		Han forces under Huo Qubing, Zhao Ponu, Zhang Qian, and Li Guang attack the Xiongnu

=== 120s BC ===
Year	Date	Event
120 BC		The Xiongnu raid Youbeiping and Xingxiang, taking 1,000 captives
119 BC	June	Battle of Mobei: Han generals Huo Qubing and Wei Qing defeat the Xiongnu
119 BC		Introduction of the iron and salt monopoly
119 BC		New taxes are levied on market transactions, vehicles, and property
119 BC		Zhang Qian goes on another trip to the Western Regions
116 BC		The Xiongnu raid Liang Province
113 BC		Reign names are introduced
112 BC		State monopoly on minting is enacted
112 BC		A Han force of 20,000 attack the Qing in eastern Tibet
111 BC		Han conquest of Nanyue: Han annexes Nanyue
111 BC		Han campaigns against Minyue: Âu Việt is defeated but the Han evacuate the Yue area rather than annex it; with the exception of Dongye at the mouth of the Min River, modern Fujian would not see significant colonization until 200 AD
111 BC		Han forces (25,000)) under Gongsun He and Zhao Ponu try to attack the Xiongnu but can't find them
111 BC		Modern Guizhou is incorporated into the empire

=== 110s BC ===
Year	Date	Event
110 BC		Emperor Wu of Han personally leads Han forces (180,000) against the Xiongnu but their chanyu decides to retreat
110 BC		Han secures a marriage alliance with the Wusun through Liu Jieyou
109 BC		Han conquest of Dian: The Dian Kingdom becomes a Han vassal
108 BC		Han conquest of Gojoseon: Han annexes Gojoseon and sets up the Lelang, Lintun, Xuantu, and Zhenfan commanderies
108 BC		Battle of Loulan: Han subjugates Qiemo and the Jushi Kingdom
106 BC		Thirteen regional inspectors are appointed to be directly answerable to the central government
105 BC		Cai Lun improves on paper using a combination of rags and plant fibers
105 BC		Aboriginals rebel in the southwest
104 BC		War of the Heavenly Horses: Li Guangli fails to make it to Dayuan
103 BC		Han forces (20,000) under Zhao Ponu attack the Xiongnu but are defeated
102 BC		The Xiongnu raid Jiuquan and Zhangye, capturing several thousand people
101 BC		War of the Heavenly Horses: Li Guangli forces Dayuan to provide horses
101 BC		Han vassalizes Fergana

== 1st century BC ==
=== 100s BC ===
Year	Date	Event
99 BC		Battle of Tian Shan: Han forces (35,000) under Li Guangli and Li Ling are defeated by the Xiongnu
98 BC		State monopoly on liquor is enacted
97 BC		Han forces (140,000) under Li Guangli attack the Xiongnu without results
94 BC	Summer	Han forces under Xu Xiangru kill the king of Suoju (around modern Yarkant County) and capture 1,500 people
91 BC		Factional strife in Chang'an results in the deaths of thousands

=== 90s BC ===
Year	Date	Event
90 BC		Han forces (79,000) under Li Guangli are defeated by the Xiongnu but another Han army (30,000) under Shang Qiucheng manages to force the Xiongnu to flee
90 BC		Han forces under Cheng Wan conquer Jushi Kingdom
87 BC		Han forces under Wen Zhong capture a city near modern Islamabad
87 BC	29 March	Emperor Wu of Han dies and is succeeded by Liu Fuling (posthumously Emperor Zhao of Han)
86 BC		Liu Dan's coup fails
86 BC		Rebellion occurs in the southwest
83 BC		Rebellion occurs in the southwest
82 BC		Zhenfan and Lintun commanderies are abandoned
82 BC		Hainan is abandoned for a time
81 BC		Discourses on Salt and Iron
81 BC		State monopoly on liquor is abolished

=== 80s BC ===
Year	Date	Event
80 BC		Liu Dan attempts another coup, which also fails
78 BC		Han forces under (20,000) under Fan Mingyou attack the Wuhuan
77 BC		After several Han envoys are killed in or near the Loulan Kingdom, supreme general Huo Guang has an envoy named Fu Jiezi assassinate the Loulan King Angui
75 BC		Goguryeo attacks Xuantu Commander
74 BC	18 July	Emperor Zhao of Han dies and the Marquis of Haihun is enthroned
74 BC	14 August	The Marquis of Haihun is deposed and replaced by Liu Bingyi (posthumously Emperor Xuan of Han)
71 BC		The Han, Wusun, Dingling, and Wuhuan coalition defeats the Xiongnu

=== 70s BC ===
Year	Date	Event
69 BC		Han forces under Chang Hui retaliate against Qiuci for killing Colonel Laidan
67 BC		Battle of Jushi: Han forces conquer the Jushi Kingdom
65 BC		Han forces under Feng Fenshi force the king of Suoju to commit suicide and enthrone another king
65 BC		Han vassalizes Qiuci
65 BC		The Qiang revolt in eastern Tibet
64 BC		The people of the Jushi Kingdom are moved to Quli to work the land
64 BC		The Xiongnu attack Jiaohe in the aftermath of the Battle of Jushi
61 BC		Han forces under Zhao Chongguo advance into Qinghai and establish colonies

=== 60s BC ===
Year	Date	Event
60 BC		The Protectorate of the Western Regions is established under Zheng Ji
53 BC		Wusun submit to Han suzerainty and are split into Greater and Lesser Kunmi

=== 50s BC ===
Year	Date	Event
49 BC		Emperor Xuan of Han dies and is succeeded by Liu Shi (posthumously Emperor Yuan of Han)
46 BC		Hainan is abandoned for a time
44 BC		The state monopoly on salt and iron is temporarily abolished
42 BC		Qiang tribes revolt in the west
41 BC		The state monopoly on salt and iron is restored
41 BC		Han forces (60,000) under Feng Fengshi crush the Qiang rebels

=== 40s BC ===
Year	Date	Event
39 BC		Yellow River dikes burst
38 BC		Emperor Yuan of Han deposes Liu Yuan, King of Hejian, disestablishing his kingdom
36 BC		Battle of Zhizhi: Han forces defeat the Xiongnu
33 BC		Emperor Yuan of Han dies and is succeeded by Liu Ao (posthumously Emperor Cheng of Han)
32 BC		The Hejian Kingdom is re-established

=== 30s BC ===
Year	Date	Event
29 BC		Yellow River dikes burst
27 BC		Aboriginals rebel in the southwest

=== 10s BC ===
Year	Date	Event
7 BC	7 May	Emperor Cheng of Han dies and is succeeded by Liu Xin (posthumously Emperor Ai of Han)
3 BC		The cult of the Queen Mother of the West spreads throughout China
1 BC	15 August	Emperor Ai of Han dies and is succeeded by Liu JIzi (posthumously Emperor Ping of Han

== 1st century ==
=== 0s ===
Year	Date	Event
1		Earliest extant blast furnaces
3		The Yellow River floods and changes course
6	2 February	Emperor Ping of Han dies and Ruzi Ying becomes heir apparent but Wang Mang becomes acting emperor
7		Wang Mang is accused of murdering Emperor Ping of Han
9	10 January	Wang Mang declares his own Xin dynasty (literally "new dynasty")
9		The slave trade is outlawed

=== 10s ===
Year	Date	Event
12		Wang Mang extends Xin territory into Qinghai
12		Xin forces defeat Goguryeo in battle
12		Aboriginals in Zangke Commandery (Guizhou) rebel
12		The slave trade ban is rescinded
13		Karasahr rebels
14		Aboriginals in Yi Province rebel
16		A Xin expeditionary army under Guo Qin massacres the population of Karasahr
17		Red Eyebrows: Rebellion erupts in modern Shandong

=== 20s ===
Year	Date	Event
22		Lulin: Rebellion erupts in Nanyang
22	11 March	Liu Xuan (later known as the Gengshi Emperor) is enthroned by the rebels
22		Red Eyebrows: Xin forces are defeated by the rebels
23	January	Lulin: Xin forces are defeated by rebels
23	7 July	Battle of Kunyang: Xin forces are defeated by rebels
23	6 October	Lulin: Rebels take Chang'an and kill Wang Mang; Luoyang falls soon after
23		Koreans raid the Lelang Commandery and take slaves
23		The Protectorate of the Western Regions is abandoned
24	March	The Gengshi Emperor relocates to Chang'an
25	July	Red Eyebrows: The Red Eyebrows enthrone their own emperor, Liu Penzi
25	5 August	Liu Xiu proclaims himself emperor (posthumously Emperor Guangwu of Han)
25	October	Red Eyebrows: The Red Eyebrows take Chang'an and strangle the Gengshi Emperor
25	27 November	Emperor Guangwu of Han takes Luoyang
25		Wang Diao takes over Lelang Commandery
27	15 March	Red Eyebrows: Rebels surrender to Emperor Guangwu of Han
29		Emperor Guangwu of Han pacifies the northern Central Plains and Nanyang
29		The Taixue is created

=== 30s ===
Year	Date	Event
30		Emperor Guangwu of Han pacifies the Lelang Commandery, southern Central Plains and Shandong
31		Du Shi uses waterwheels to power piston-bellows for blast furnaces
32		Ban Gu is born
34		Emperor Guangwu of Han defeats Wei Ao and pacifies the northwest
36	25 December	Emperor Guangwu of Han defeats Gongsun Shu and takes Chengdu, restoring the Han

=== 40s ===
Year	Date	Event
40		Trung sisters' rebellion: Yue tribes rebel in Jiaozhi
43		Trung sisters' rebellion: The Trưng Sisters are decapitated
44		Han forces under Ma Yuan are defeated by Xiongnu
45		Ban Zhao is born
45		Aboriginals rebel in the southwest
45		Xiongnu raid Changshan
48		Aboriginals rebel in Wuling Commandery (northwestern Hunan)
49		Wuhuan settle in the northwest and north of the Central Plain
49		Qiang tribes retake the Qinghai region

=== 50s ===
Year	Date	Event
51		An Ailao tribe defects to Han
57	29 March	Emperor Guangwu of Han dies and is succeeded by Liu Yang (posthumously Emperor Ming of Han)

=== 60s ===
Year	Date	Event
63		The Xiongnu gain control of the Western Regions and start raiding Han
65		Liu Ying becomes the first documented sponsor of Buddhism in China
69		An Ailao tribe defects to Han

=== 70s ===
Year	Date	Event
70		The southern flow of the Yellow River is eliminated
73		Battle of Yiwulu: Han general Dou Gu defeats the Xiongnu and restores the Protectorate of the Western Regions
74		Han forces capture Jushi Kingdom
75	5 September	Emperor Ming of Han dies and is succeeded by Liu Da (posthumously Emperor Zhang of Han)
77		The Protectorate of the Western Regions is abandoned

=== 80s ===
Year	Date	Event
88	9 April	Emperor Zhang of Han dies and is succeeded by Liu Zhao (posthumously Emperor He of Han)
89		Battle of the Altai Mountains: Han general Dou Xian defeats the Xiongnu

=== 90s ===
Year	Date	Event
90		The Protectorate of the Western Regions is restored
92		Ban Gu dies
93		The Xiongnu settle in southern Shaanxi

== 2nd century ==
=== 100s ===
Year	Date	Event
106	13 February	Emperor He of Han dies and is succeeded by Liu Long (posthumously Emperor Shang of Han)
106	21 September	Emperor Shang of Han dies and is succeeded by Liu Hu (posthumously Emperor An of Han)
106		Goguryeo invades Xuantu Commandery
107		The Protectorate of the Western Regions is abandoned
107		Aboriginals rebel in the southwest
108		Qiang tribes raid the Central Plains

=== 110s ===
Year	Date	Event
111		The Book of Han is finished by Ban Zhao
116		Ban Zhao dies
116		Aboriginals rebel in the southwest
117		Han forces under Ren Shang defeat the Qiang

=== 120s ===
Year	Date	Event
123		Aboriginals rebel in the southwest
125	30 April	Emperor An of Han dies and is succeeded by the Marquess of Beixiang
125	16 December	Eunuch loyalists overthrow the Marquess of Beixiang and enthrone Liu Bao (posthumously Emperor Shun of Han)

=== 130s ===
Year	Date	Event
132		Han retakes some of Xuantu Commandery from Goguryeo
132		Zhang Heng invents the seismometer
137		Rebellion erupts in Rinan

=== 140s ===
Year	Date	Event
140		The Xiongnu overrun the Tiger's Teeth encampment near Chang'an
140		The Qiang rebel
142		The Qiang rebellion is defeated
144	20 September	Emperor Shun of Han dies and is succeeded by Liu Bing (posthumously Emperor Chong of Han)
144	December	Rebellion erupts in Jiujiang
145	15 February	Emperor Chong of Han dies and is succeeded by Liu Zuan (posthumously Emperor Zhi of Han)
145		Rebels attack Guangling and Jiujiang
145		Xianbei raid Dai Commandery
145		Hua Meng declares himself the Black Emperor and gets killed
146	26 July	Emperor Zhi of Han dies and is succeeded by Liu Zhi (posthumously Emperor Huan of Han)
146		Policy of assimilation in the southwest is implemented through education programs

=== 150s ===
Year	Date	Event
156		Aboriginals rebel in the southwest
159		Aboriginals rebel in the southwest

=== 160s ===
Year	Date	Event
166		The Xianbei raid Han territory
167		Han forces under Duan Jiong massacre the Qiang
168	25 January	Emperor Huan of Han dies and is succeeded by Liu Hong (posthumously Emperor Ling of Han)
169		Duan Jiong defeats the Xianlian Qiang

=== 170s ===
Year	Date	Event
176		Aboriginals rebel in the southwest
177		Han forces (20,000) under Xia Yu and Tian Yan are defeated by the Xianbei

=== 180s ===
Year	Date	Event
184	spring	Yellow Turban Rebellion: The Yellow Turbans ravage the north and east and are defeated
184	winter	Liang Province rebellion: A rebellion occurs in Liang province (Liangzhou; 涼州; roughly present-day Wuwei, Gansu)
185		The imperial palace is damaged by fire and special taxes are levied for rebuilding
188		Governors are appointed to unify provincial administrations
189	summer	Emperor Ling of Han dies; Empress He and her brother He Jin enthrone Liu Bian and establish a regency government
189	winter	The Ten Eunuchs kill He Jin and are themselves massacred by Yuan Shao; Dong Zhuo takes control of Luoyang and deposes Liu Bian in favor of his half-brother Liu Xie, Emperor Xian of Han

=== 190s ===
Year	Date	Event
190		Campaign against Dong Zhuo: An anti-Dong Zhuo alliance forms in the east, led by Yuan Shao
190		Dong Zhuo burns Luoyang, loots the imperials tombs, and relocates to Chang'an; the coalition breaks up and local officials set themselves up as warlords
190		Cai Yong dies
191		Zhang Lu sets up a theocracy in Hanzhong
192		Wang Yun and Lü Bu kill Dong Zhuo and Wang Yun himself is killed by Dong Zhuo's officers Li Jue and Guo Si
192		Cao Cao takes over Yan Province
195		Emperor Xian of Han escapes from Chang'an
195		Sun Ce sets up south of the Changjiang
196		Emperor Xian of Han relocates to Xuchang under Cao Cao's control
197		Campaign against Yuan Shu: Yuan Shu takes the imperial title but is driven south by Cao Cao
199		Battle of Yijing: Yuan Shao eliminates Gongsun Zan in You Province
199		Yuan Shu dies

== 3rd century ==
Year	Date	Event
200		Battle of Guandu: Yuan Shao is defeated by Cao Cao northeast of modern Zhongmou, Henan
200		Sun Ce dies and is succeeded by his brother Sun Quan
200		Zheng Xuan dies
202		Yuan Shao dies and is succeeded by his younger son Yuan Shang
203		Cao Cao's campaigns to unify northern China begin
207		Battle of White Wolf Mountain: Cao Cao defeats the Wuhuan and unites northern China
208		Liu Biao dies in Jing Province and Cao Cao takes over
208		Battle of Red Cliffs: Cao Cao is defeated on the Changjiang, west of modern Jiangxia, Hubei, by Sun Quan and Liu Bei
210		Liu Bei occupies the south of Jing Province
211		Battle of Tong Pass: Cao Cao defeats Ma Chao and Han Sui and starts campaigning in northwestern China
211		Liu Bei's takeover of Yi Province: Liu Zhang invites Liu Bei to Yi Province (covering present-day Sichuan and Chongqing)
214		Liu Bei's takeover of Yi Province: Liu Bei takes control of Yi Province from Liu Zhang
215		Battle of Yangping: Zhang Lu surrenders Hanzhong to Cao Cao
216		Cao Cao declares himself King of Wei
219	spring	Battle of Mount Dingjun: Liu Bei defeats Cao Cao's general Xiahou Yuan and takes Hanzhong
219	autumn	Liu Bei becomes King of Hanzhong
219	autumn	Battle of Fancheng: Liu Bei's general Guan Yu attacks north in Jing Province
219	winter	Lü Meng's invasion of Jing Province: Sun Quan's general Lü Meng attacks Guan Yu and seizes the south of Jing Province
220		Guan Yu is executed by Sun Quan
220	spring	Cao Cao dies at Luoyang and is succeeded by his son Cao Pi
220		The Nine-rank system is implemented
220	winter	Cao Pi forces Emperor Xian of Han to abdicate and declares himself Emperor of the Wei dynasty; so ends the Han dynasty

== Gallery ==
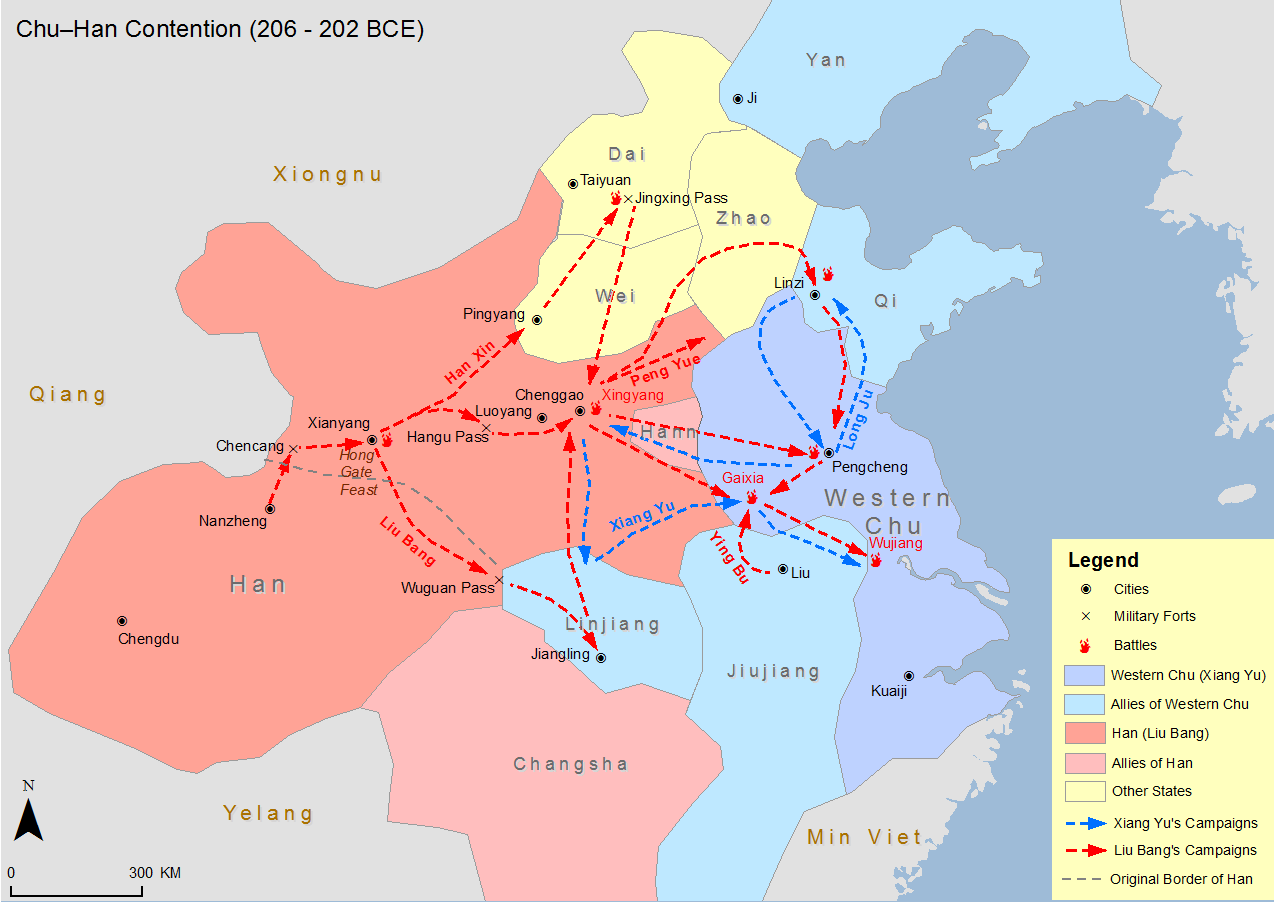
Chu-Han Contention (207 BC–202 BC)

Han dynasty, 190 BC - kingdoms in red, commanderies in black

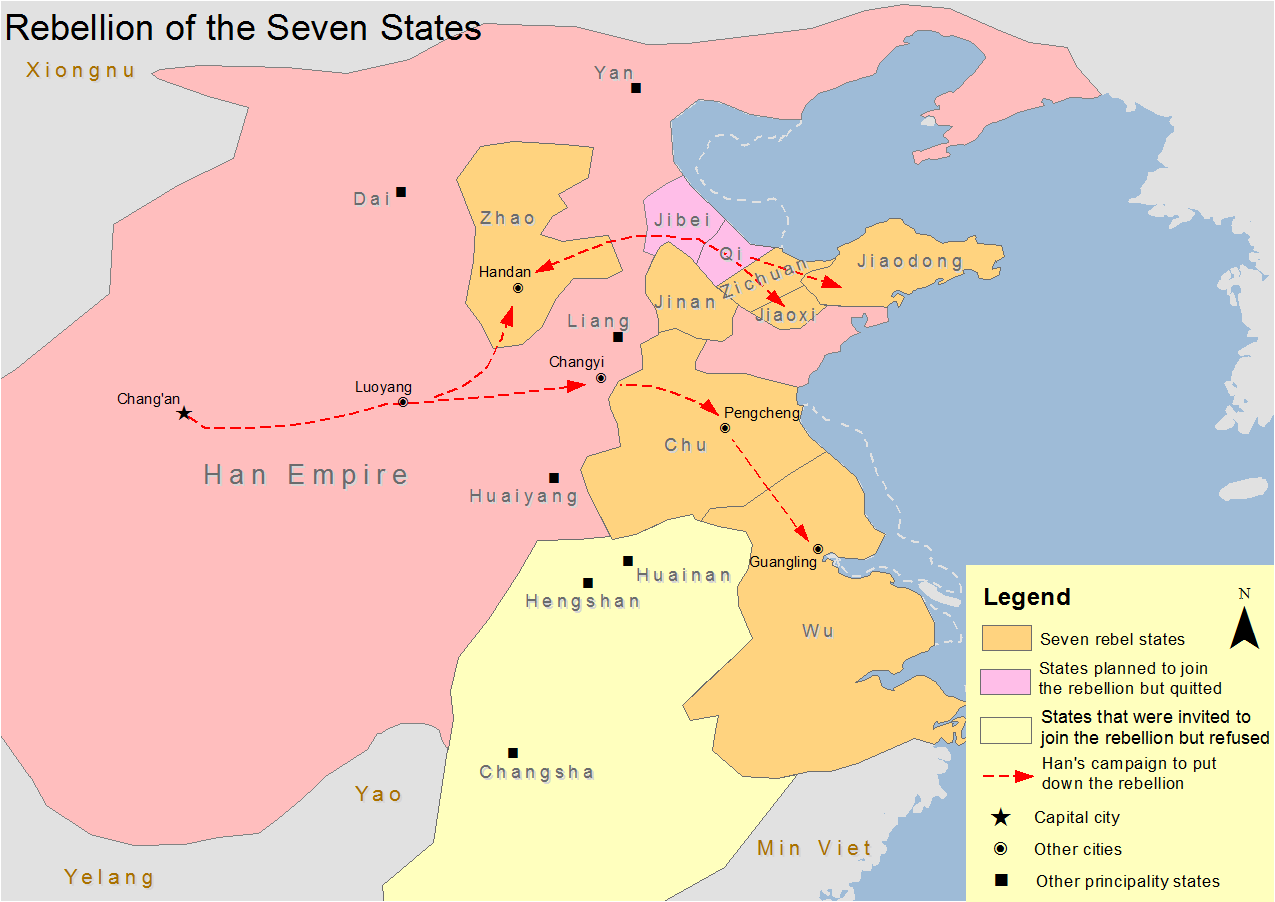
154 BC - Rebellion of the Seven States

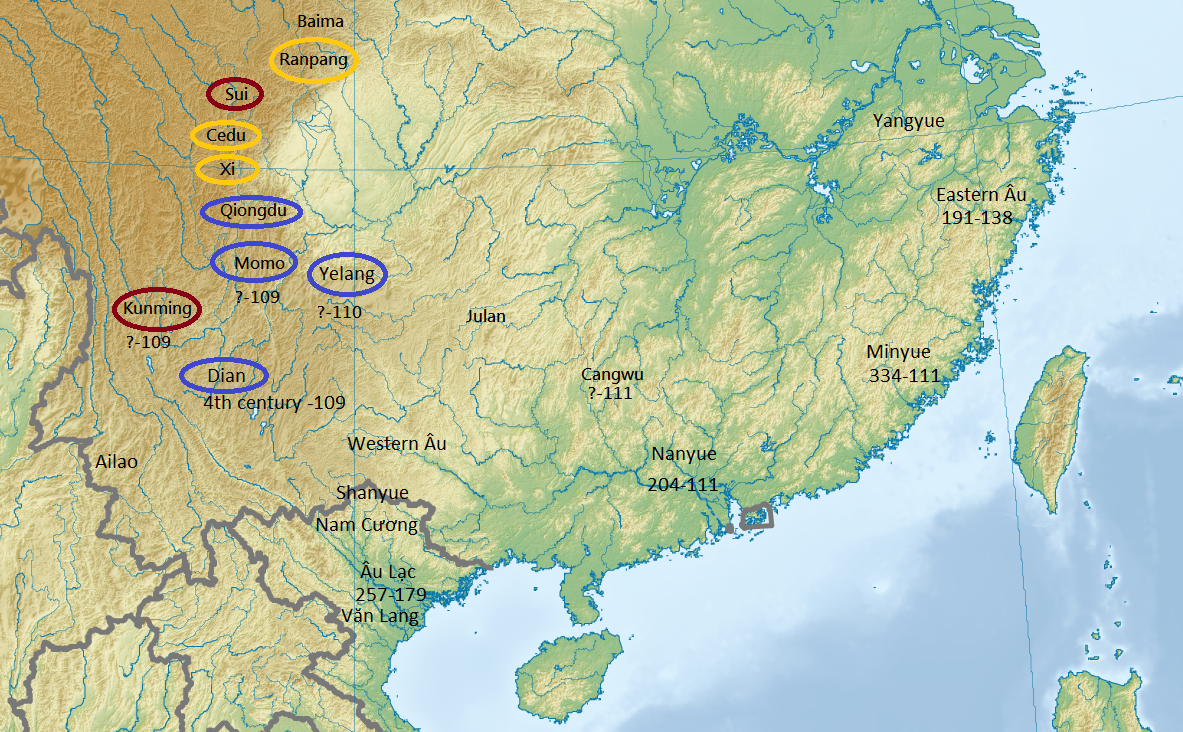
Southern tribes in ancient China - red means nomadic, yellow is semi-nomadic, and purple is sedentary.

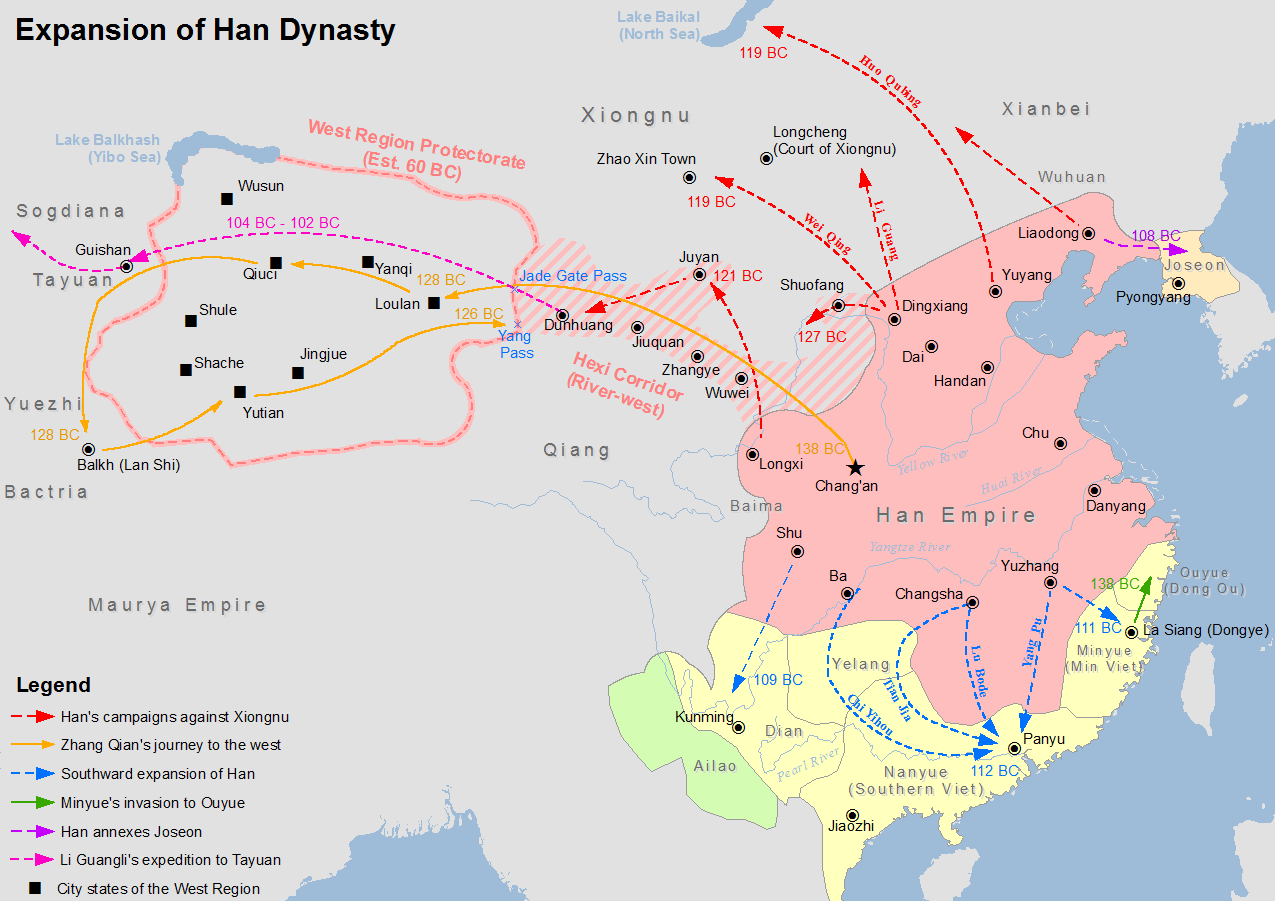
Han campaigns

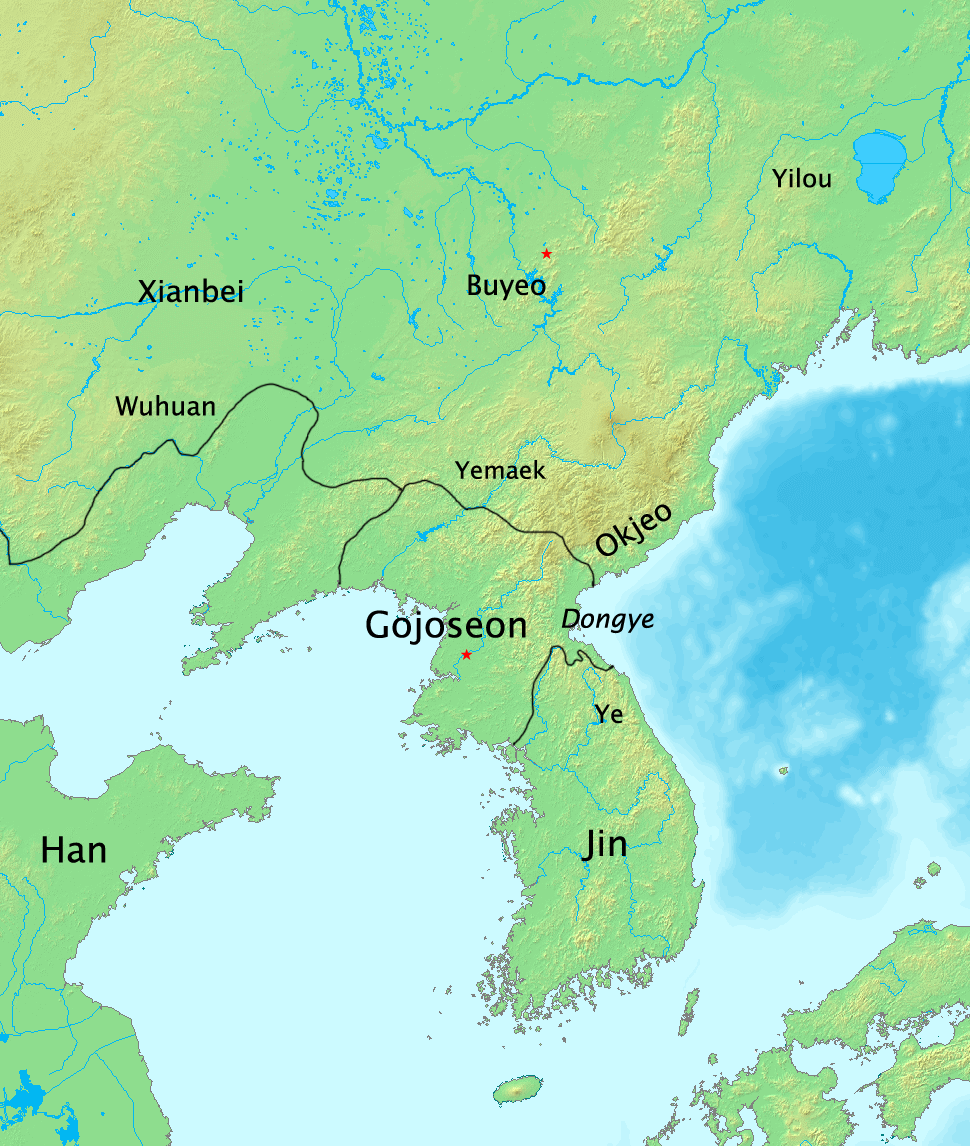
Korea 108 BC

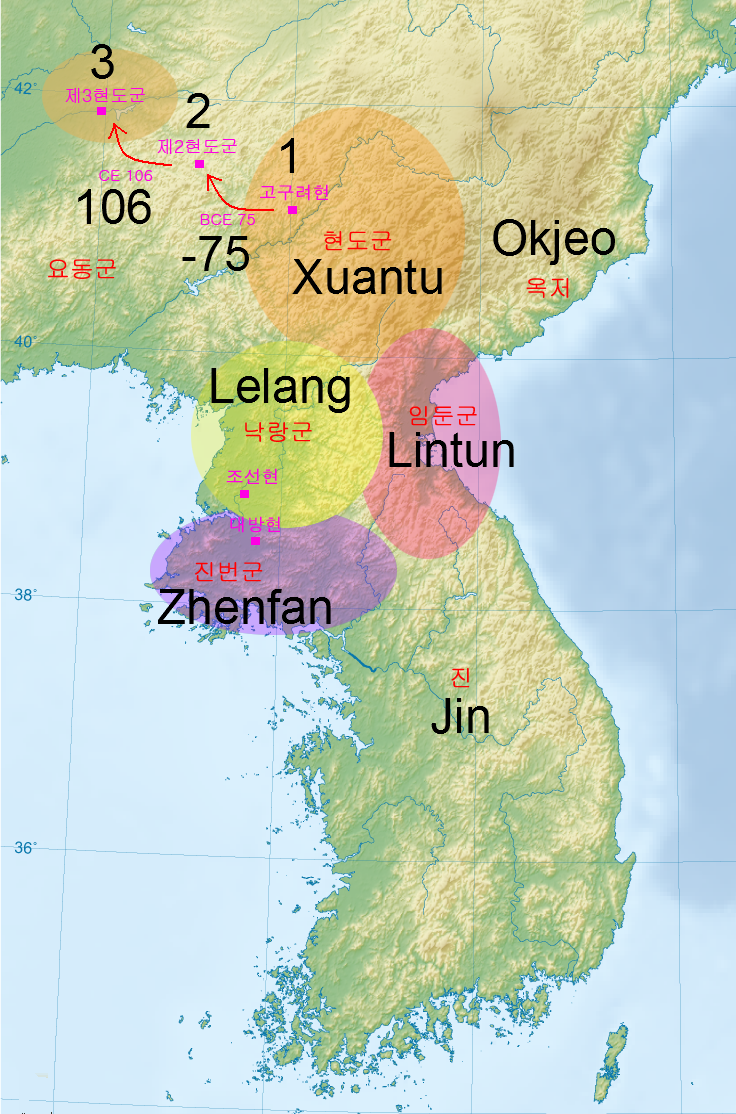
The Four Commanderies of Han, 107 BC

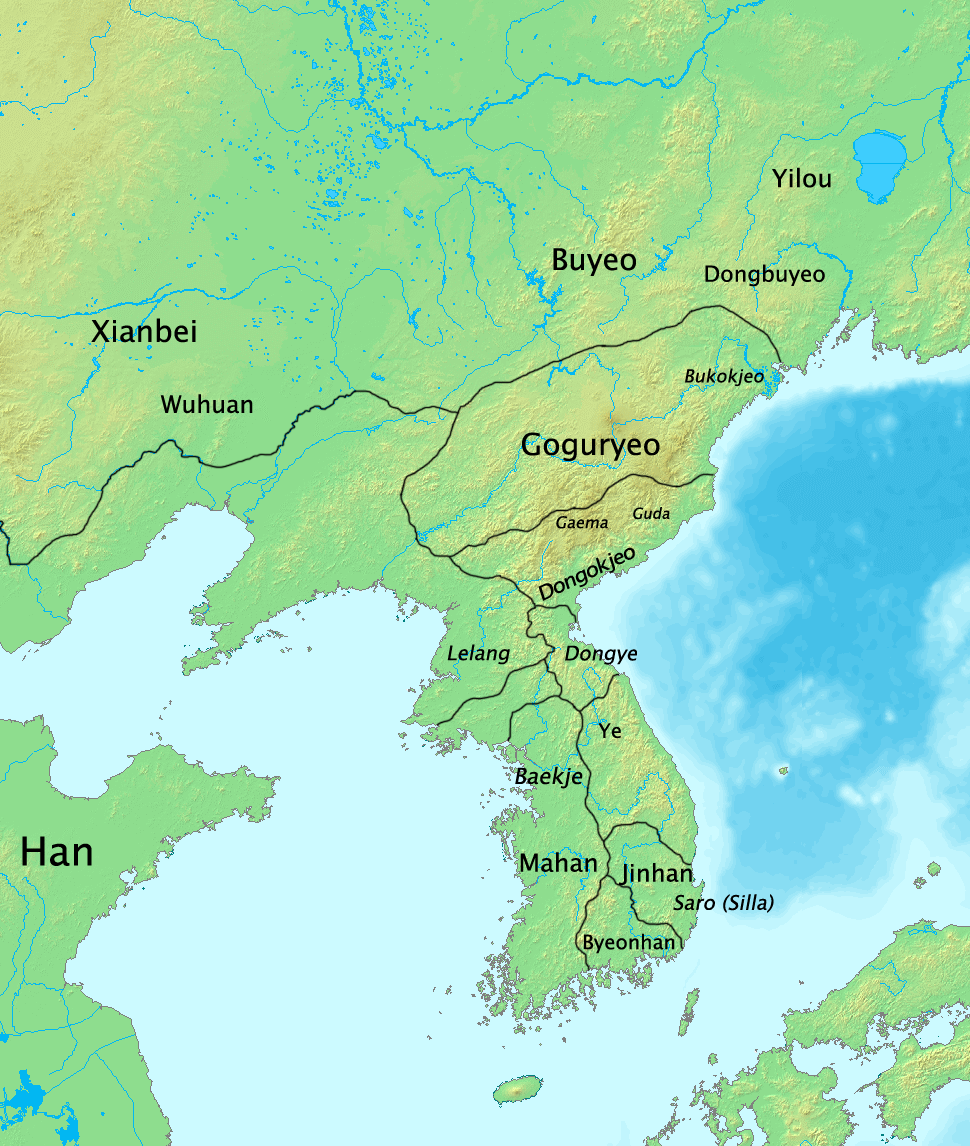
Korea in 1 AD

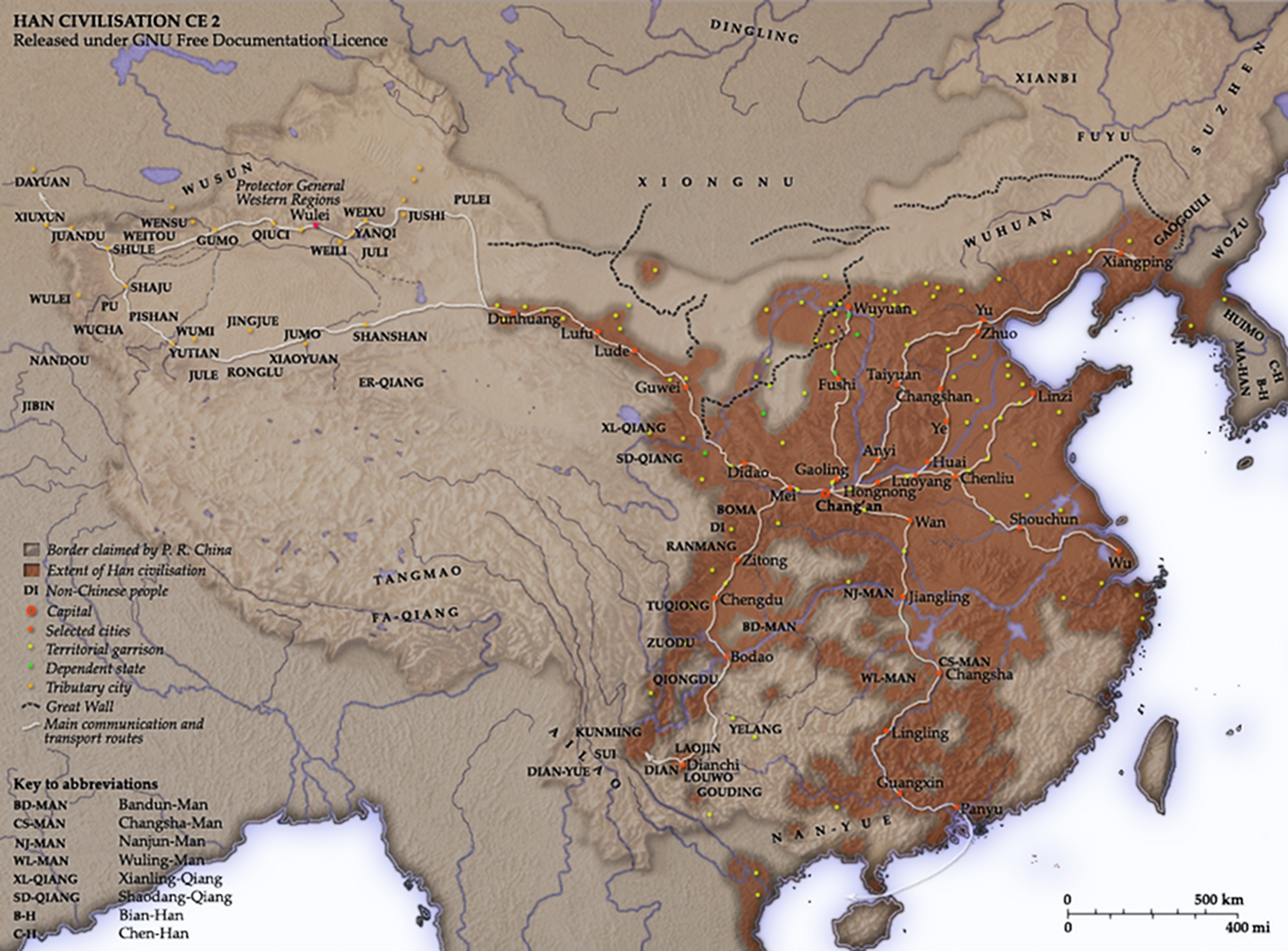
Extent of Han culture in 2 AD

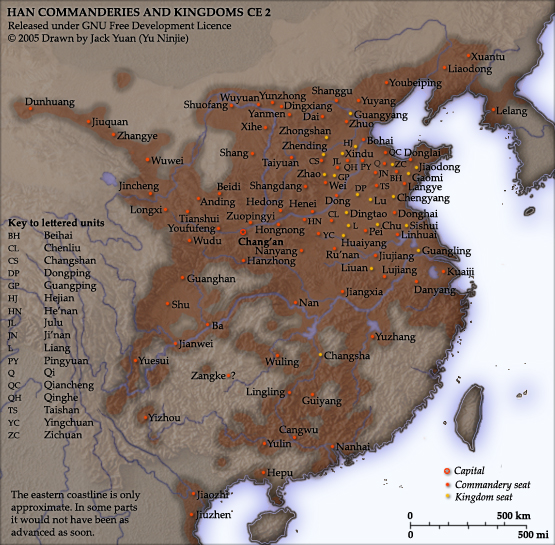
Han commanderies and kingdoms, 2 AD

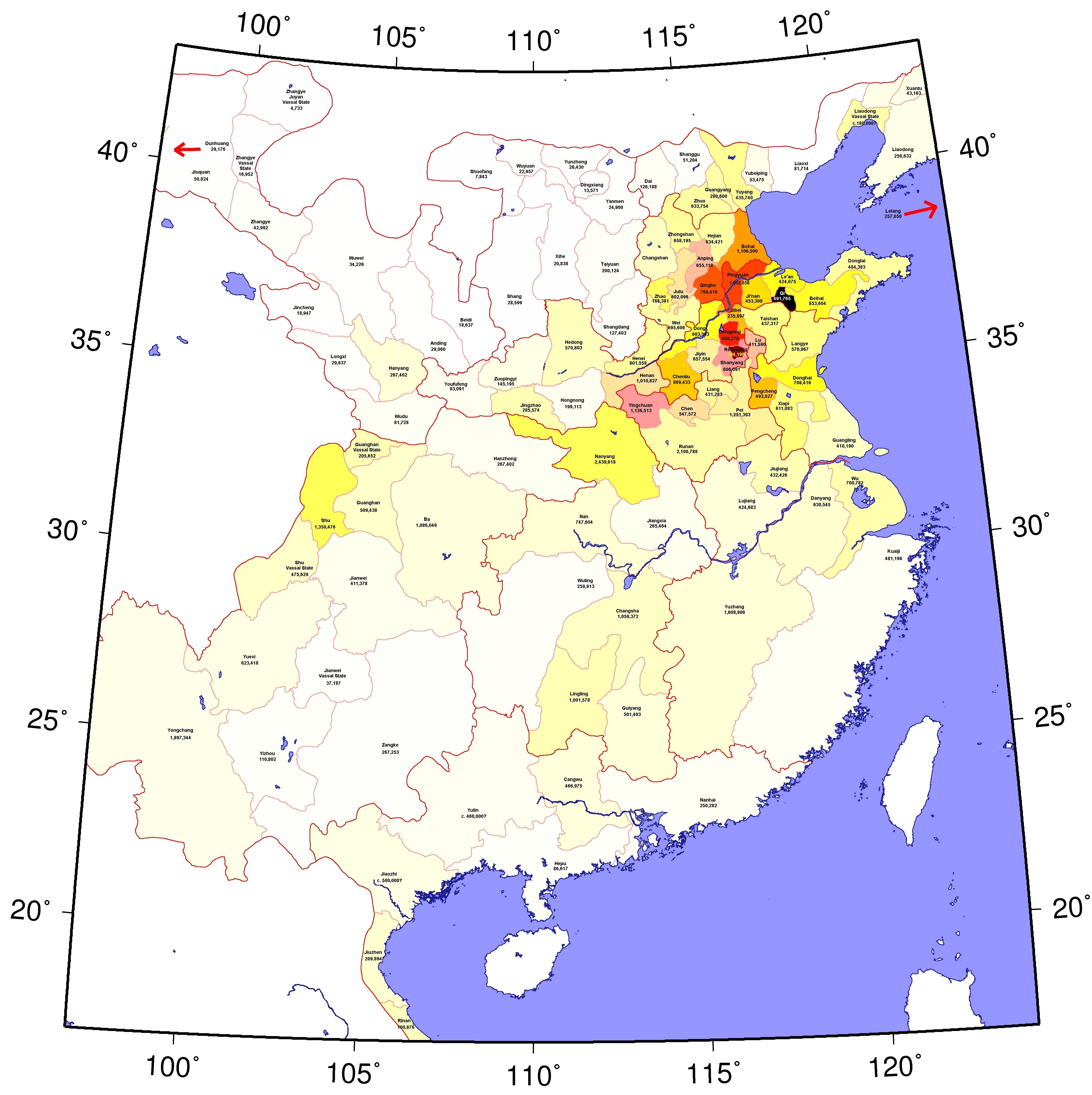
Han dynasty population distribution in 2 AD

Major Yellow River course changes

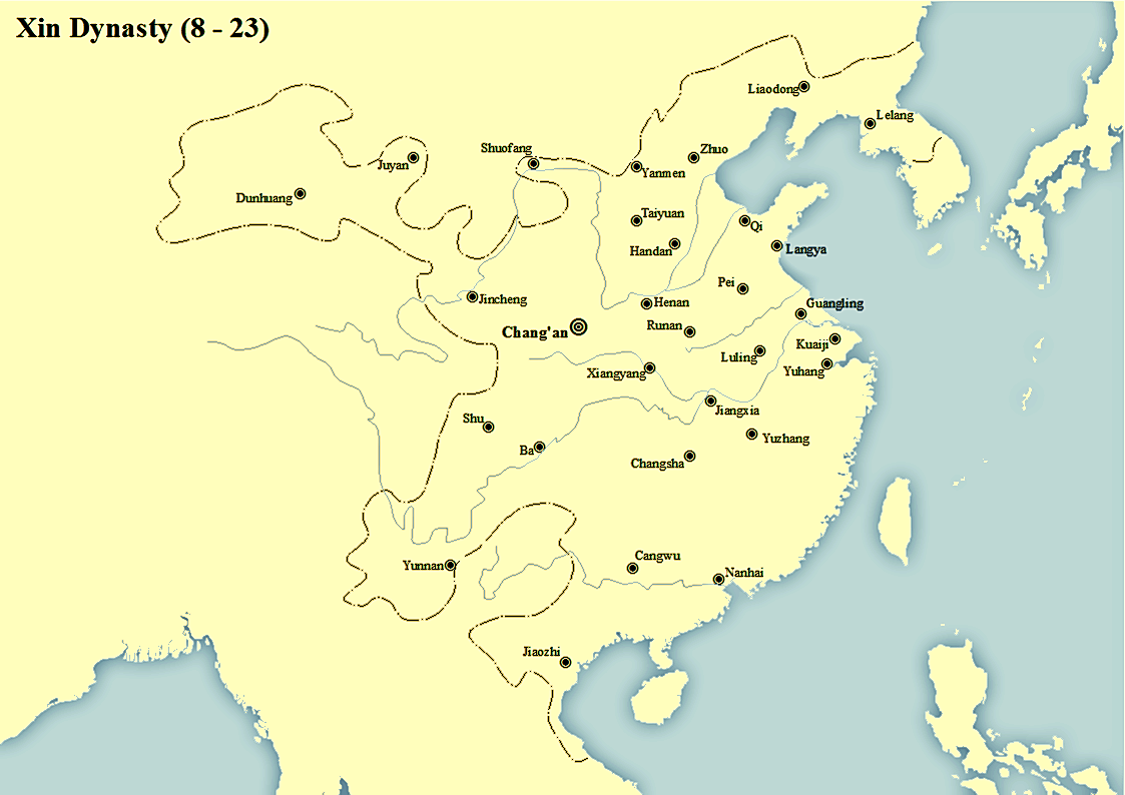
Xin dynasty

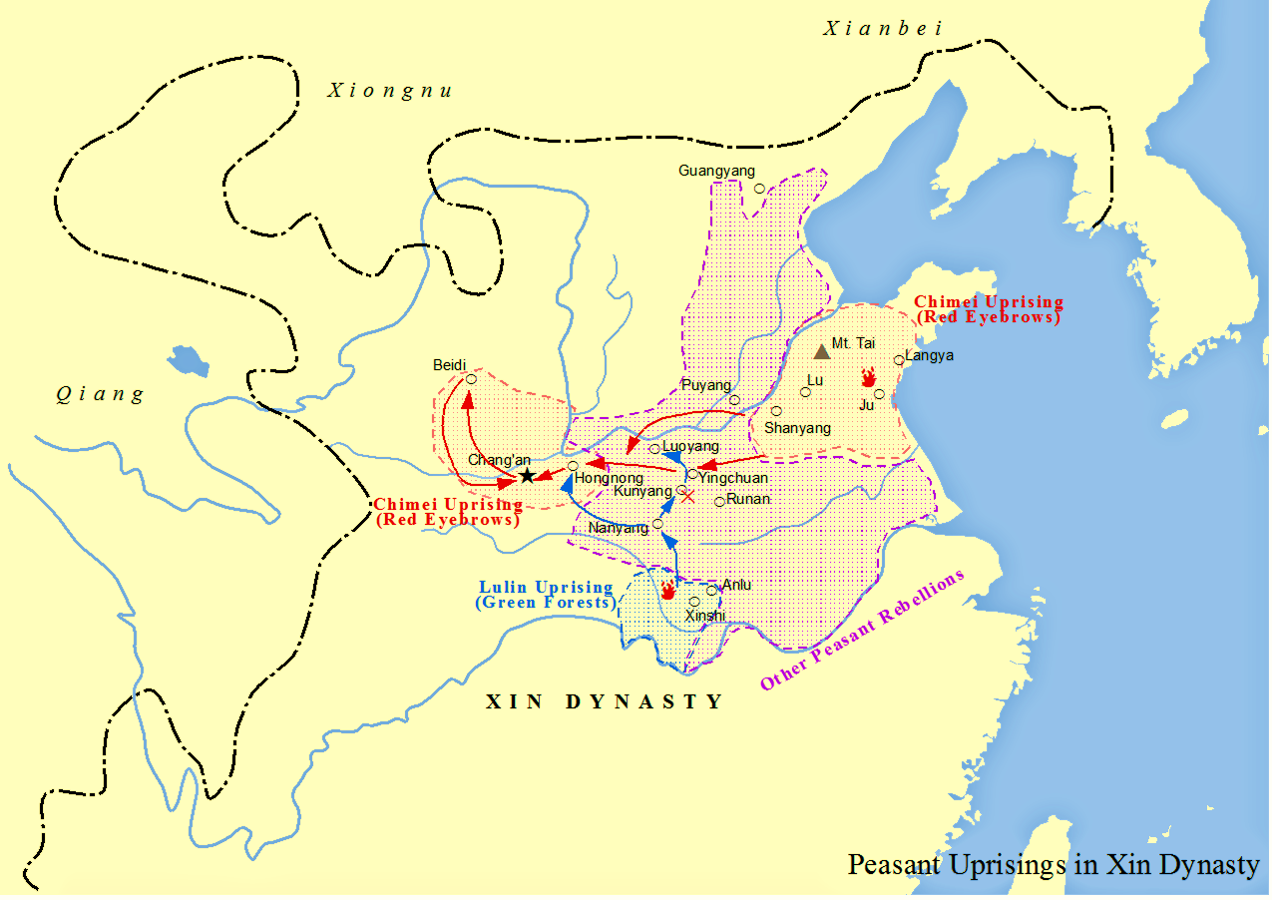
Uprisings during the Xin dynasty

Han dynasty, 140 AD

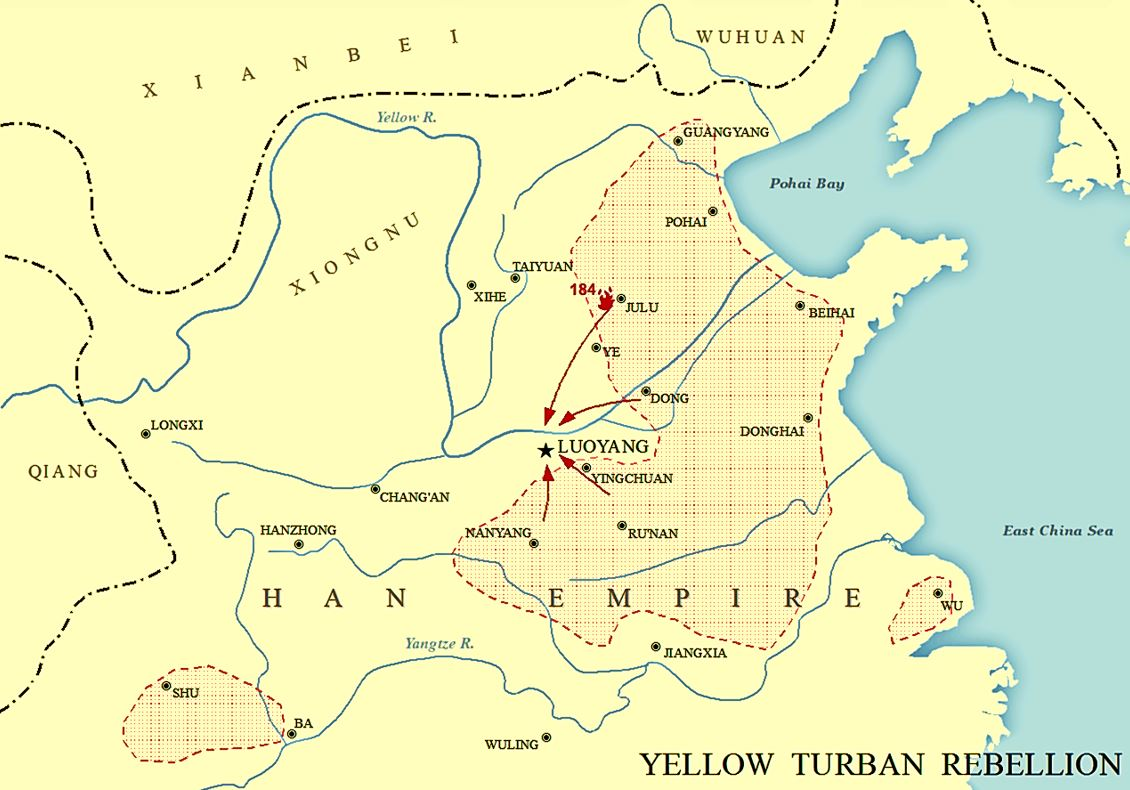
Yellow Turban Rebellion

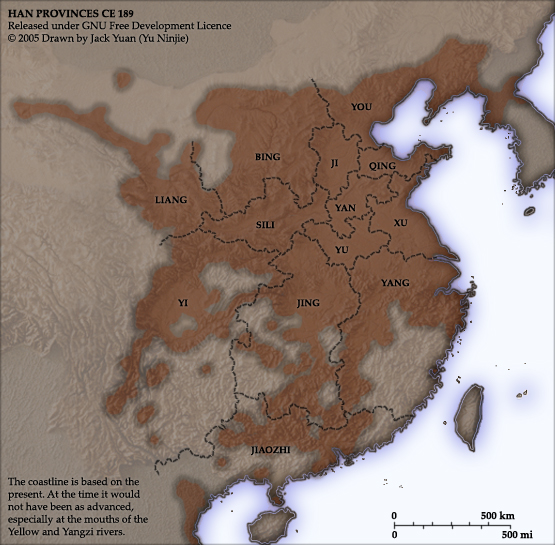
Han provinces, 189 AD

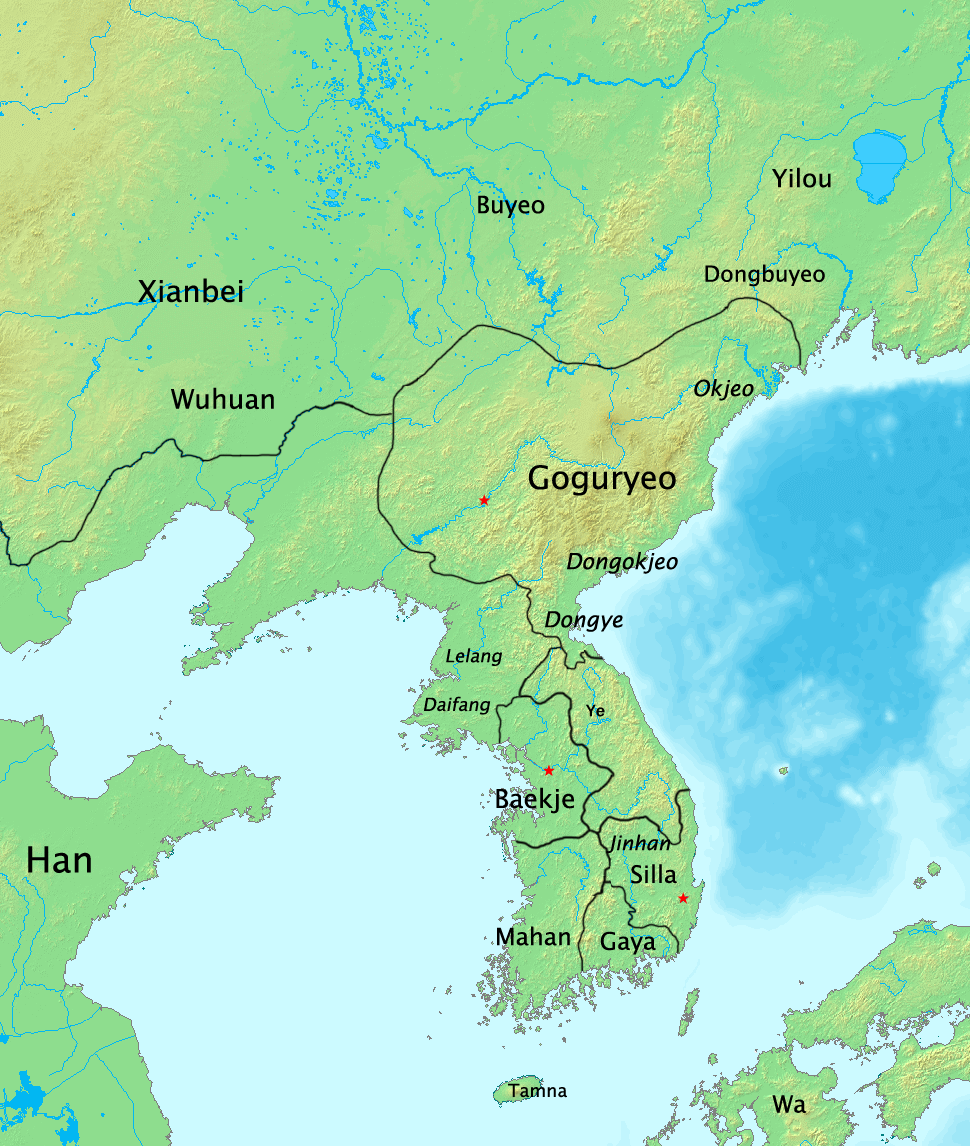
Korea 204 AD

== See also ==
- Economy of the Han dynasty
- Government of the Han dynasty
- History of the Han dynasty
- Military of the Han dynasty
- Science and technology of the Han dynasty
- Society and culture of the Han dynasty

== Bibliography ==
- Barrett, Timothy Hugh (2008), The Woman Who Discovered Printing, Great Britain: Yale University Press, ISBN 978-0-300-12728-7 (alk. paper)
- Chang, Chun-shu (2007), The Rise of the Chinese Empire 1, The University of Michigan Press
- Crespigny, Rafe (2007), A Biographical Dictionary of Later Han to the Three Kingdoms (23-220 AD), Brill
- Crespigny, Rafe de (2017), Fire Over Luoyang: A History of the Later Han Dynasty, 23-220 AD, Brill
- Ebrey, Patricia Buckley; Walthall, Anne; Palais, James B. (2005), East Asia: A Cultural, Social, and Political History, Boston: Houghton Mifflin, ISBN 0-618-13384-4
- Knapp, Ronald G. (1980), China's Island Frontier: Studies in the Historical Geography of Taiwan, The University of Hawaii
- Loewe, Michael (2000). A Biographical Dictionary of the Qin, Former Han and Xin Periods (221 BC - AD 24). Leiden: Brill Publishers. ISBN 978-90-04-10364-1.
- Shin, Michael D. (2014), Korean History in Maps, Cambridge University Press
- Twitchett, Denis (2008), The Cambridge History of China 1, Cambridge University Press
- Xiong, Victor Cunrui (2009), Historical Dictionary of Medieval China, United States of America: Scarecrow Press, Inc., ISBN 978-0810860537
