= Sun Deng (Xin dynasty) =

Xin dynasty rebel

- Traditional Chinese: 孫登
- Simplified Chinese: 孙登
Transcriptions
Standard Mandarin
- Hanyu Pinyin: Sūn Dēng
- Wade–Giles: Sun Teng
Yue: Cantonese
- Jyutping: Syun^{1} Dang^{1}
Middle Chinese
- Middle Chinese: Swon Tong
Old Chinese
- Baxter–Sagart (2014): Sˤun Tˤəŋ

Sun Deng (Chinese: 孫登) was briefly appointed puppet emperor by a coalition of Chimei "Red Eyebrows" rebels in December of 26 CE, but later that month was killed by his general Yue Xuan 樂玄 when the rebels surrendered to the superior forces of Emperor Guangwu of Han (r. 25–57).

After the Chimei and Lülin "Green Forest" agrarian rebellion movements collectively brought down Wang Mang's short Xin dynasty (9-23 CE), the Chimei forces allowed the Lülin leader Liu Xuan to become Gengshi Emperor (r. 23–25) and restore the dynasty. The Chimei rebels subsequently destroyed Gengshi's army and assassinated him, in order to establish their own puppet emperor Liu Penzi (r. 25–27) who was nominally enthroned in the capital Chang'an, until he surrendered after Emperor Guangwu's generals Deng Yu and Feng Yi defeated the remaining Chimei rebels. While both Sun Deng and Liu Penzi were Chimei-supported pretenders to the Han throne, "Emperor" Penzi is better known than Sun Deng.

The (5th century) Hou Hanshu "Book of the Later Han", which covers Han dynasty history from 6 to 189 CE, is the primary historical source about Sun Deng.

First, the "Annals of Emperor Guangwu" records that in December of 26, a confederation of Tongma 銅馬 "Bronze Horses", Qingdu 青犢 "Green/Black Calves", Youlai 尤來, and other rebel groups in the Shang Commandery 陝郡 (roughly modern Sanmenxia, Henan) established Sun Deng as their puppet emperor. The Bronze Horses and Green Calves originated as followers of Mother Lü (d. 18), the first female leader of rebels in Chinese history.

The Bronze Horses, the Green Calves, the Yu-lai and the remaining bandits in the Shang Commandery together set up Sun Teng as the Son of Heaven. Sun Teng’s General, Yo Hsüan killed Sun Teng, and surrendered with his band of more than 50,000 men. [銅馬青犢尤來餘賊共立孫登為天子於上郡 登將樂玄殺登以其眾五萬餘人降].

On February 27, Emperor Guangwu's generals Deng Yu and Feng Yi defeated the remaining Chimei, who "surrendered with more than a hundred thousand men" at Yiyang 宜陽 (modern Luoyang).

Second, the Hou Hanshu biography of the scholar Di Pu 翟酺 mentions Sun Deng. When Di Pu was restoring lost books in the imperial library, he told his colleague Sun Yi 孫懿 about a book that said the rebel Sun Deng used his brilliance to harm Han court eunuchs [圖書有漢賊孫登，將以才智為中官所害]. The Hou Hanshu commentary identifies it as the apocryphal Confucian text Chunqiu baoqqian tu 春秋保乾圖, which says, "The anti-Han rebel leader Sun Deng was a big, tall man who employed ingenious methods and many techniques, although without a classical education, he was a sage who said little" [漢賊臣名孫登大形小口長七尺九寸巧用法多技方詩書不用賢人杜口].
