= Prince of Chengyang =

Prince of Chengyang may refer to:

- Rulers of the Chengyang Kingdom during the Han and Jin periods
  - Liu Zhang (prince) (died 177 BC)
- Mu Tipo (died 577), official who became a prince of Northern Qi
