= Sun Deng =

Sun Deng (Wade–Giles: Sun Teng) is the name of:

- Sun Deng (Xin dynasty) (died 26 AD), rebel leader
- Sun Deng (Eastern Wu) (209–241), crown prince
- Sun Deng (recluse) (fl.third century), Taoist recluse
