= Shenggong =

Shenggong may refer to:

- Gengshi Emperor (died AD 25), courtesy name Shenggong (Chinese: 聖公), an emperor of the Han dynasty
- Chinese for "mercuric chloride" (昇汞; shēnggǒng)

== See also ==
- St. Joseph Hospital light rail station (Chinese: 聖功醫院站; pinyin: Shènggōngyīyuàn zhàn), a light rail station of Circular light rail, Kaohsiung, Taiwan
