= Ziying (disambiguation) =

Ziying (子嬰) may refer to:

- Ziying of Zheng or Ying of Zheng, the seventh monarch of the duchy of Zheng, vassal state of the Zhou dynasty. Also known as Viscount of Zheng (Chinese: 鄭子; pinyin: Zhèng-zǐ).
- Ziying of Qin, the third ruler of the Qin dynasty.
- Ruzi Ying, the emperor of the Han dynasty.
