= Mother Lü =

1st-century AD Chinese rebel leader against the Xin dynasty

- 呂母
- Born: unknown
- Died: 18 AD
- Known for: first female rebel leader in Chinese history
- Children: Lü Yu

Mother Lü (Chinese: 呂母; pinyin: Lǚ Mǔ; died 18 AD) was a rebel leader against the Xin dynasty of China. She started a peasant uprising after her son was executed by the government for a minor offence, and became the first female rebel leader in Chinese history. After she died of an illness, her followers became a major force of the Red Eyebrows rebellion which played a significant role in the downfall of the Xin dynasty and the restoration of the Han dynasty by Liu Xiu.

== Background ==
Mother Lü was born during the Western Han dynasty of China. In 9 AD, the chief minister Wang Mang usurped the imperial throne and proclaimed himself Emperor of the Xin dynasty. Wang implemented a number of policies which were opposed by the wealthy landowning class. Economic stress caused by the flooding of the Yellow River further weakened the legitimacy of his rule.

Mother Lü lived in Haiqu County (海曲縣), Langya Commandery, in present-day Rizhao, Shandong province. Her family was very wealthy, worth millions of coins according to the Book of the Later Han.

== Rebellion ==
In 14 AD, her son Lü Yu (呂育), who had served in the government of Haiqu County, was executed by the county magistrate for a minor offence. To avenge his death, Mother Lü plotted a rebellion, using her wealth to recruit poor peasants and purchase weapons and supplies. She soon raised an army of several thousand people from a populace that had already been dissatisfied with the government. Mother Lü assumed the title of general and led her rebel force to storm the capital of Haiqu County. After capturing the county magistrate, she beheaded him and sacrificed his head on her son's tomb.

== Death and legacy ==
Mother Lü's success inspired numerous people all over the country to rebel against Wang Mang's rule, and her own force grew rapidly to tens of thousands of soldiers, but she soon died of an illness in 18 AD.

After her death, most of Lü's followers joined forces with Fan Chong, another native of Langya who had rebelled in Ju County in 18 AD. The joint army became known as the Red Eyebrows, which was one of the two leading rebel forces that would overthrow Wang Mang's regime.

Historians credit Mother Lü with starting the wave of uprisings that led to the downfall of the Xin dynasty and the restoration of the Han dynasty by Liu Xiu (Emperor Guangwu), the first emperor of Eastern Han. She is the first female rebel leader recorded in Chinese history.
