= Red Eyebrows =

Rebellion movement against the Xin dynasty

- Chinese: 赤眉
Transcriptions
Standard Mandarin
- Hanyu Pinyin: Chìméi
- Wade–Giles: Ch'ih^{4}-mei^{2}
- IPA: [ʈʂʰɨ̂.měɪ]
Yue: Cantonese
- Jyutping: Cek^{3}-mei^{4}
- IPA: [tsʰɛk̚˧.mej˩]

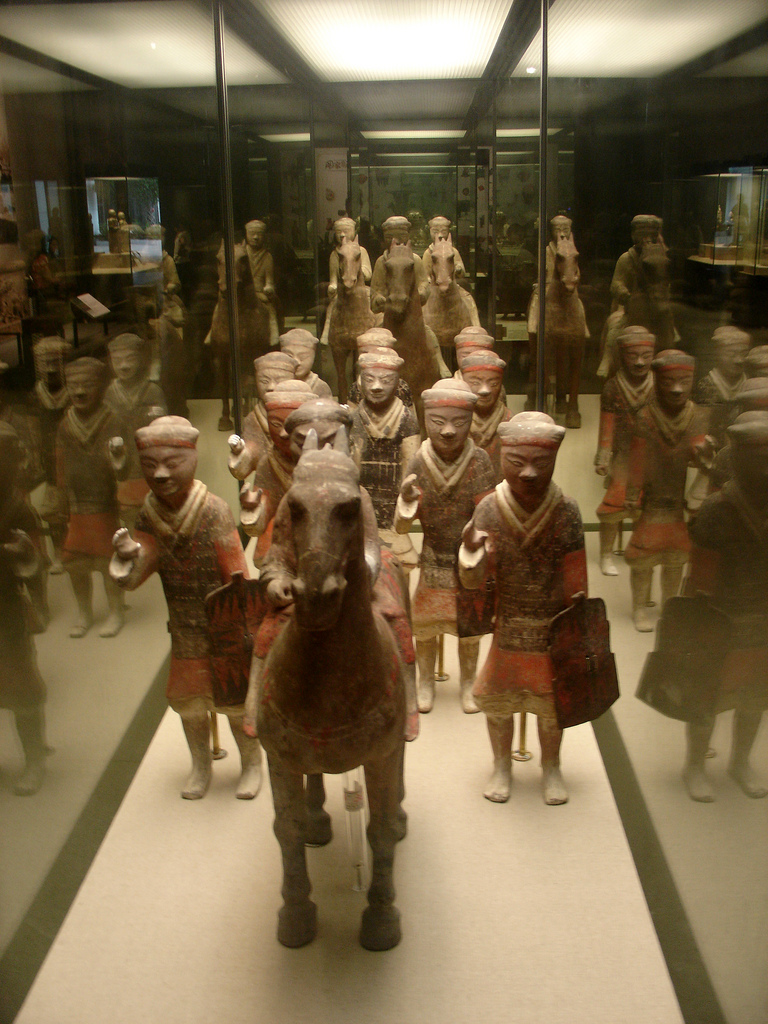
Painted ceramic statues of one Chinese cavalryman and ten infantrymen with armor, shields, and missing weapons in the foreground, and three more cavalrymen in the rear, from the tomb of Emperor Jing of Han (r. 157-141 BCE), now located at the Hainan Provincial Museum

The Red Eyebrows (Chinese: 赤眉; pinyin: Chìméi) was one of the two major peasant rebellion movements against Wang Mang's short-lived Xin dynasty, the other being Lülin. It was so named because the rebels painted their eyebrows red.

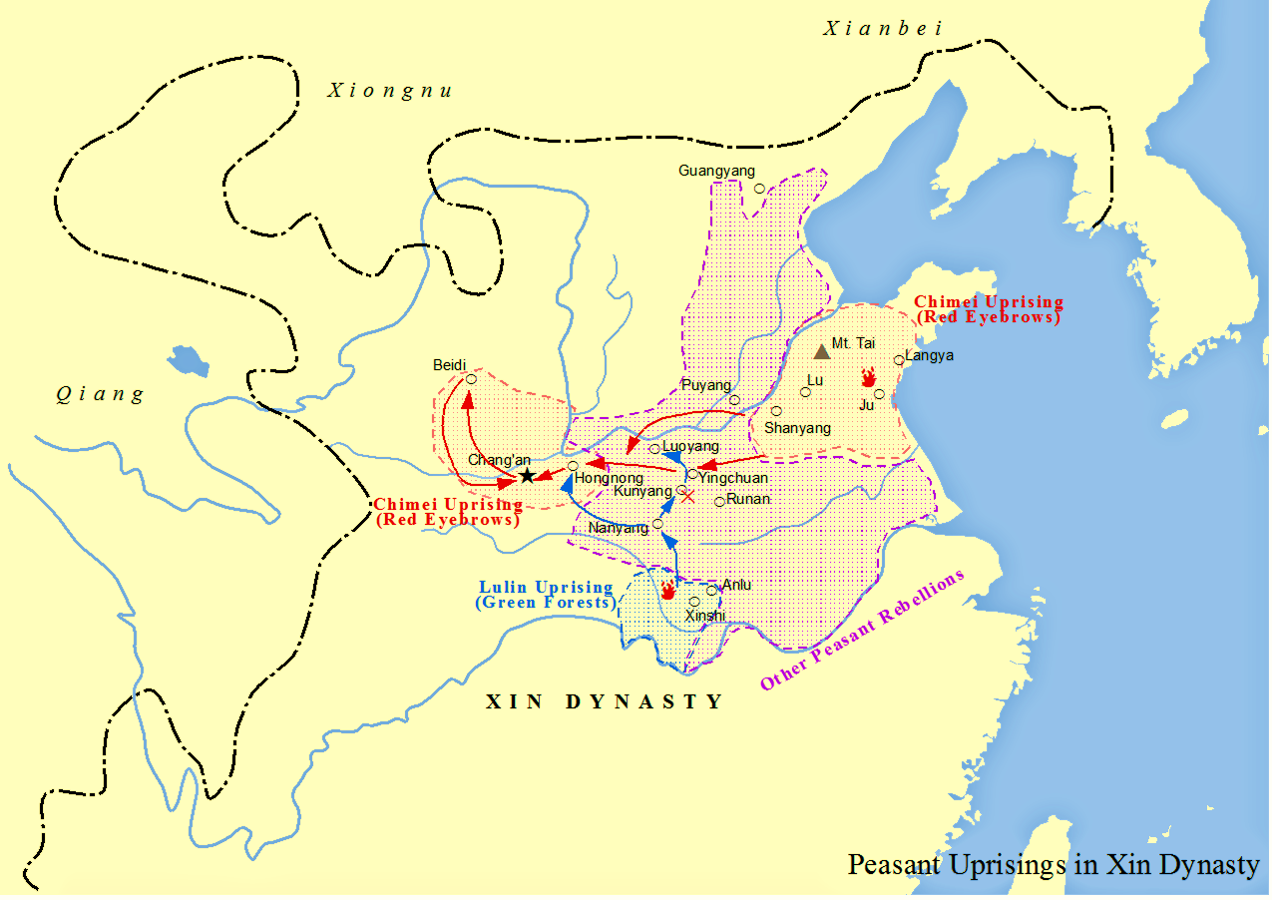
Map of peasant uprisings in Xin dynasty, including Lulin and Red Eyebrows rebellions

The rebellion, initially active in the modern Shandong and northern Jiangsu regions, eventually led to Wang Mang's downfall by draining his resources, allowing Liu Xuan (the Gengshi Emperor), leader of the Lülin, to overthrow Wang and temporarily reestablish an incarnation of the Han dynasty. The Red Eyebrows later overthrew the Gengshi Emperor and placed their own Han descendant puppet, teenage emperor Liu Penzi, on the throne, who ruled briefly until the Red Eyebrows leaders' incompetence in ruling the territories under their control caused the people to rebel against them, forcing them to retreat and attempt to return home. When their path was blocked by the army of Liu Xiu's (Emperor Guangwu) newly established Eastern Han regime, they surrendered to him.

== Rise and first rebellion ==
Circa 17 CE, due to Wang Mang's incompetence in ruling—particularly in his implementation of his land reform policy—and a major Yellow River flood affecting the modern Shandong and northern Jiangsu regions, the people who could no longer subsist on farming were forced into rebellion to try to survive. The rebellions were numerous and fractured. Two key examples are discussed below.

=== Fan Chong ===
Fan Chong (樊崇, who would eventually become the leader of the Red Eyebrows, albeit in a collective leadership) started his own rebellion in 18 CE, in the Ju and Langya counties (near modern Rizhao region). He used Mount Tai as his base, and he was able to gather about 10,000 men. He soon entered into an alliance with other rebel leaders Pang An (逄安), Xu Xuan (徐宣), Xie Lu (謝祿), and Yang Yin (楊音), pooling resources with them, and they soon became powerful and unstoppable for the local governments.

=== Mother Lü ===
The case of Mother Lü was a highly unusual one. Her son was a minor official at the Haiqu county (海曲, in modern Rizhao, Shandong) government, who was accused of a minor offence and executed by the county magistrate. Mother Lü, who was a substantial landowner, sold off her property and used the proceeds to recruit poor young men. When she gathered thousands, she stormed the county seat in the year 17 CE and killed the magistrate to avenge her son's death. Mother Lü's success inspired numerous people all over the country to rebel against Wang Mang's rule, and her own force grew rapidly to tens of thousands of soldiers, but she soon died of an illness in 18 CE. After her death, most of Lü's followers joined forces with Fan Chong.

=== Joining of the forces ===
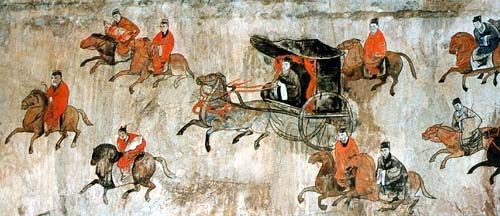
A mural showing chariots and cavalry, from the Dahuting Tomb (Chinese: 打虎亭汉墓, Pinyin: Dahuting Han mu) of the late Eastern Han dynasty (25-220 CE), located in Zhengzhou, Henan province, China

In 19 CE, at the behest of his key official Tian Kuang (田況), Wang Mang reacted inappropriately to the agrarian rebellions by raising taxes. This action only aggravated the agrarian rebels. In 21 CE, Wang sent vice generals Jing Shang (景尚) and Wang Dang (王黨) to try to put down the rebellions, but Jing and Wang's soldiers were so lacking in military discipline that they further angered the populace which had not rebelled, which caused them to join or help the rebels. Tian, who had earlier aggravated the rebellions, however, had some success against them, and he advocated a policy where the villagers would be evacuated to the cities to force the rebels into attacking fortifications. Wang, who by this point had come to distrust Tian due to his military successes, refused to support Tian and summoned him back to the capital Chang'an.

About this time, Mother Lü died, and her followers joined forces with Fan Chong's forces.

By this point, Fan and the other rebel leaders still lacked any real political ambition, even as they were showing genuine military abilities. The only rules of law that they had among the rebels was that one who murders would die, and one who wounds would be responsible for the care of the victim until he or she heals. The only titles for the rebel leaders were "county educator" (三老, sanlao), "county clerk" (從事, congshi), and "sheriff" (卒史, zushi), not more grandiose titles such as "general" or "prince".

=== Confrontation with Xin forces ===
By 22 CE, the forces that Jing and Wang led against Fan and other rebel generals were in a shambles, and in 22 CE, Fan killed Jing in battle.

Wang Mang reacted by sending two of his senior generals, Wang Kuang (王匡) and Lian Dan (廉丹) with a massive regular force of over 100,000 men against these rebels. Fan and the other rebel leaders, concerned that during battles it would become impossible to tell friend or foe, ordered that their men colour their eyebrows red. It was from this action that the name Chimei (which literally means "red eyebrows") derived.

Wang and Lian, while capable generals on the battlefield, failed to maintain proper military discipline. This led to a famous lament by the people victimized by their forces:

I'd rather meet the Chimei than the Taishi [太師, Wang's title]. The Taishi is relatively mild, but Gengshi [更始, Lian's title -- should not be confused with Liu Xuan's title] wants to kill me!

In winter 22 CE, Wang and Lian had some successes against the Chimei leader Suolu Hui (索盧恢), capturing the city of Wuyan (無鹽, in modern Tai'an, Shandong). Rather than allowing their forces to rest, Wang decided to attack the Chimei stronghold of Liang (梁, in modern Shangqiu, Henan), and Lian reluctantly attacked Liang with him. At the battle of Chengchang (成昌, in modern Tai'an, Shandong), the tired Xin forces were defeated by the Chimei and collapsed. Lian died in battle and Wang fled without his troops. This ended any serious attempt by Xin forces against the Chimei, as Xin was then confronted by the Lülin revolt. The Lülin forces went on to capture Chang'an in 23 CE and kill Wang Mang, ending the Xin dynasty and placing Gengshi Emperor on the throne.

== Temporary submission to Gengshi Emperor ==
After Wang Mang's death, the entire empire largely, at least nominally, submitted to Gengshi Emperor as the legitimately restored Han emperor. Gengshi Emperor temporarily placed his capital at Luoyang, and he sent diplomats to try to persuade Chimei generals to submit as well. Fan Chong and the other key generals agreed with around 20 Chimei generals going to Luoyang where they were made marquesses. However, they were not given any actual marches, and, seeing that their men were about to disband, they left Luoyang back to their base at Puyang. The strategist Liu Lin (劉林) suggested to Liu Xiu, then a key general of the Gengshi Emperor's, to break the Yellow River levee and destroy the Chimei by that manner, but Liu Xiu refused.

== Second rebellion and demise ==
=== Campaign against Chang'an ===
By late 24 CE, while Chimei was strong militarily, the soldiers were fatigued from all of the wars and wanted to return home. Fan and the other leaders concluded that in order to keep them together, a bigger goal needed to be set. They therefore set their eyes on the Gengshi Emperor's regime, which by then had relocated to Chang'an. The Chimei forces were divided into two armies, one led by Fan and Pang, targeting Wu Gate (武關, in modern Shangluo, Shaanxi), and the other led by Xu, Xie, and Yang, targeting Luhun Gate (陸渾關, in modern Luoyang, Henan), but both aiming for Chang'an.

In spring 25 CE, the two armies combined at Hongnong (弘農, in modern Sanmenxia, Henan) and defeated a major general of Gengshi Emperor's, Su Mao (蘇茂). By this point the Chimei had grown to about 300,000 men. Gengshi Emperor's generals wanted to abandon Chang'an and head back to their home territory in modern southern Henan and northern Hubei, but Gengshi Emperor refused.

About this time, after being urged to do so by priests of the late Liu Zhang (Prince Jing of Chengyang whose principality many Chimei men came from and who was worshipped as a god after his death in 177 BCE) the Chimei leaders seriously considered the idea of finding one of Liu Zhang's descendants and making him emperor to inherit the Han throne. They found three of Liu Zhang's male descendants among their army, and, after drawing lots, they made one of them, the 15-year-old Liu Penzi, emperor. However, the new "emperor" had no real power and continued to serve as a cattleman in the army.

In autumn 25, Chimei forces captured Chang'an, and the Gengshi Emperor fled, being followed by only a few loyal supporters, including Liu Zhi (劉祉) the Prince of Dingtao and Liu Gong (劉恭) the Marquess of Shi, who was Liu Penzi's older brother. The Gengshi Emperor soon surrendered and, under intercession by Liu Gong, was made the Prince of Changsha.

=== Loss of popular support ===
Meanwhile, Emperor Penzi was installed on the Han throne in Chang'an. Initially, the people of the Guanzhong (modern central Shaanxi) region submitted and offered tributes, but were surprised when the Chimei soldiers continuously robbed them on the way to Chang'an. The locals soon resumed maintaining and defending their outposts. They also started to look forward to Liu Xiu, who by then had declared himself as an emperor as well (establishing the Eastern Han dynasty), and his general Deng Yu, whose forces were then stationed nearby but not confronting the Chimei forces. At that time, Liu Xiu was content to consolidate his control over the Commanderies of Shang, Beidi, and Anding (modern northern Shaanxi and eastern Gansu) and to wait for the Chimei to collapse by themselves.

The people of Chang'an, under direct Chimei rule, began to yearn for the return of the Gengshi Emperor. In response, the Chimei general Xie Lu, who was in charge of the Gengshi Emperor at that time, strangled him. Liu Gong hid Gengshi Emperor's body and prepared it for eventual burial.

In 26 CE, Liu Gong, seeing the dangers of the situation for his brother the emperor, decided to make one attempt to either bring the situation under control or disengage his brother from his risky position. At the New Year's Day imperial gathering, Liu Gong first spoke and asked that Emperor Penzi be allowed to yield the throne, and Emperor Penzi jumped off the throne, took the imperial seal off himself, and spoke while crying:

Now there is an emperor, but everyone continues to act as robbers. The people hate us and do not trust us. This is because you chose the wrong Son of Heaven. Please return my body to me. But if you want to kill me to divert blame, then I must die.

Fan and the other leaders were ashamed, and they left their seats and bowed down to Emperor Penzi, apologizing for their failures. They physically forced Emperor Penzi back onto the throne and put the imperial seal back onto him. For weeks after the incident, the generals restrained their soldiers from unlawful acts, and the people praised Emperor Penzi as a merciful and brilliant emperor. However, the lawlessness returned before long. Soon, the food supplies were completely depleted, and the Chimei forces burned many Chang'an palaces and other buildings and pillaged the city, then marched west into the modern eastern Gansu region.

=== Flight back east and collapse ===
In autumn 26 CE, the Chimei forces attacked the territory held by the regional warlord Wei Xiao (隗囂), but were repelled by Wei. At this time, they suffered from a sudden cold spell that froze many soldiers to death. They headed back east and re-entered Chang'an and engaged in a series of battles with Deng and, despite their reduced strength at this time, defeated Deng's forces. These wars led to a severe famine in the Guangzhong region, which affected not only the people of the region but also both Chimei and Deng's forces. Chimei, lacking food, eventually abandoned Chang'an and headed east. Liu Xiu set up two forces at Xin'an (新安, in modern Luoyang, Henan) and Yiyang (宜陽, also in modern Luoyang) to block their progress, as his forces under Deng and Feng Yi, whom he had sent to relieve Deng, continued to battle the Chimei. In spring 27 CE, the Chimei won a great victory against both Deng and Feng at Hu (湖縣, in modern Sanmenxia, Henan). (This event represented a rarity in historical accounts in that the battle tactics that demonstrated the Chimei generals' brilliance were recorded). The Chimei general engaged in the tactic of feigning defeat and retreat, abandoning what appeared to be supplies of food. Deng's forces, who were hungry, tried to take the food, which turned out to only contain one layer of beans with dirt underneath. Having limited Deng's forces to a small area, the Chimei forces then attacked and defeated them.

However, this victory would be the last for the Chimei. About a month later, they suffered a major defeat at Feng's hands. Feng created confusion for the Chimei by also colouring his troops' eyebrows red. The remnants of the Chimei withdrew east toward Yiyang. Liu Xiu personally led the troops to wait for them. As the Chimei arrived at Yiyang, they were surprised to see Liu Xiu's overwhelming forces. So they decided to negotiate surrender terms. After Liu Xiu agreed not to execute Emperor Penzi, the Chimei emperor and generals surrendered.

== Aftermath ==
The Chimei generals and their families were settled in the Eastern Han capital of Luoyang and given regular stipends and land, but not official positions. Eventually, Fan and Pang prepared to rebel again, but their plans were discovered and they were executed. Yang and Xu returned to their homelands and died of old age there. Xie was assassinated by Liu Gong to avenge the Gengshi Emperor, and Liu Xiu, sympathetic to Liu Gong, pardoned him.

Liu Xiu made the former Emperor Penzi an assistant to his uncle Liu Liang (劉良), the Prince of Zhao. Later, Liu Penzi suffered an illness that blinded him. So Liu Xiu gave him a large swath of farmland, allowing him to survive on the rent from the farms for the rest of his life.
