= Ruzi Ying =

Emperor of China from 6 to 9 CE

Liu Ying 劉嬰

Emperor of the Han dynasty
- Reign: 3 February 6–10 January 9 CE
- Predecessor: Emperor Ping
- Successor: Gengshi Emperor (23 CE)
- Born: 5 CE
- Died: 25 CE
- Burial: Unknown
- House: Liu
- Dynasty: Han (Western Han)

Ruzi Ying (Chinese: 孺子嬰; pinyin: Rúzi Yīng; lit. 'Infant Ying'; 5 – February or March 25 CE), personal name Liu Ying (劉嬰), was the 15th monarch of the Han dynasty of China and the last monarch of the Western Han dynasty. He was the titular ruler of the Han Empire from 6 CE to 9 CE, even though he did not officially ascend to the throne and only assumed the title of crown prince. After Emperor Ai and Emperor Ping died without heirs, Wang Mang chose the youngest of the available successors in order to maintain his power in the government. The child Ying was soon deposed by Wang Mang who declared the Xin dynasty in place of the Han. During the Xin dynasty, Ying was under effective house arrest—so much so that as an adult, he did not even know the names of common animals. Before and after the Xin dynasty was overthrown in 23 CE, a number of ambitious individuals claimed to be restoring the Han dynasty. In 25 CE, a rebellion against the Gengshi Emperor used Liu Ying as a focus, and when the rebellion was defeated, Liu Ying was killed. He is often viewed as an innocent child who was the victim of tragic circumstances.

== Choice as the titular ruler ==
In 5 CE, Wang Mang, then already nearly unlimited in power as the imperial regent and fearful that the 13-year-old Emperor Ping, once grown-up, would retaliate against him for having slaughtered his uncles in 3 CE, murdered Emperor Ping by poisoning him. Because the young emperor had not had any children by his wife Empress Wang (Wang Mang's daughter) or any of his concubines, there was no heir. Emperor Ping's grandfather, Emperor Yuan, had no surviving male issue. Of his three sons, Emperor Cheng had no issue, and sons of the other two, Liu Kang, Prince of Dingtao (劉康) and Liu Xing, Prince of Zhongshan (劉興), had succeeded to the imperial throne (as Emperor Ai and Emperor Ping, respectively) and died without issue. The descendants of Emperor Ping's great-grandfather Emperor Xuan were therefore considered as possible successors.

There were 53 great-grandsons of Emperor Xuan then still living by this stage, but they were all adults, and Wang Mang disliked that situation. He wanted a child whom he could control. Therefore, he declared that it was inappropriate for members of the same generation to succeed each other (even though Emperor Ping had succeeded his cousin Emperor Ai several years earlier). He then considered the 23 great-great-grandsons of Emperor Xuan—all of whom were infants or toddlers.

While the examination process was proceeding, the mayor of South Chang'an submitted a rock with a mysterious red writing on it -- "Wang Mang, the Duke of Anhan, should be emperor." (During his regency, Wang, building a personality cult about himself, had made it an open secret that he encouraged the manufacturing of false prophecies that would call for him to have more and more power; this appears to be one of those instances.) Wang had his political allies force his aunt, Grand Empress Dowager Wang Zhengjun, to issue an edict granting him the title of "Acting Emperor" (假皇帝), with the commission to rule as emperor until a great-great-grandson of Emperor Xuan could be selected and raised.

On 17 April 6 CE, Acting Emperor Wang selected Ying, then just one year old, as the designated successor to Emperor Ping, claiming that soothsayers told him that Ying was the candidate most favoured by the gods. He gave Ying the epithet Ruzi—the same epithet that King Cheng of Zhou had when he was in his minority and under the regency of Ji Dan, the Duke of Zhou—to claim that he was as faithful as the Duke of Zhou. However, Emperor Ruzi did not ascend the throne, but was given the title of crown prince. Empress Wang, who was only 14, was given the title empress dowager.

== Brief "reign" ==
Several members of the imperial Liu clan were suspicious of Acting Emperor Wang's intentions. They started or assisted in several failed rebellions against Wang:

- In 6 CE, Liu Chong (劉崇), the Marquess of Anzhong, made an attack against Wancheng (宛城, in modern Nanyang, Henan). His attack failed, but historians did not specify what happened to him, only that as punishment, Wang had his house filled with filthy water.
- In 7 CE, Zhai Yi (翟義), the governor of the Commandery of Dong (roughly modern Puyang, Henan) and Liu Xin (劉信), the Marquess of Yanxiang (and the father of Liu Kuang (劉匡), the Prince of Dongping (roughly modern Tai'an, Shandong) started the largest of these rebellions. They were joined by agrarian rebellion leaders Zhao Peng (趙朋) and Huo Hong (霍鴻) from the area immediately west of the capital Chang'an. They declared Liu Xin emperor. Wang Mang responded by sending messengers around the nation to pledge that he would in fact return the throne to Emperor Ruzi once Ruzi was an adult. Wang's armies defeated Zhai and Liu's armies in the winter of 7 CE, and Zhai was captured and executed by drawing and quartering. Liu fled and was never captured. Zhao and Huo were also eventually defeated and executed.
- In 9 CE (after Wang Mang had usurped the throne), Liu Kuai (劉快), the Marquess of Xuxiang, attacked the Fuchong dukedom of his brother Liu Ying (劉殷), the former Prince of Jiaodong. He was defeated and died while fleeing from the battle.

After Zhai and Liu Xin were defeated, Wang became even more satisfied that the empire was entirely under his control, and decided to finally seize the throne and start a new dynasty. In the winter of 8 CE, a prophecy written on a casket was presented by Ai Zhang (哀章). The prophecy was said to be a divine decree from Emperor Gao (Liu Bang) stating that the throne should be given to Wang, and that Empress Dowager Wang (who was Wang Mang's own daughter) should follow this divine will. Wang issued a decree accepting the position of emperor and establishing the Xin dynasty.

== Life during the Xin dynasty ==
In the spring of 9 CE, Wang Mang, now emperor, made the former Emperor Ruzi the Duke of Ding'an (and made his daughter, the former Empress Dowager, Duchess Dowager). The dukedom allegedly included 10,000 households, in which Han emperors were to be enshrined in temples, and Han calendars and uniforms would be allowed. However, Wang did not actually follow through on these promises. Indeed, he never allowed the Duke of Ding'an to rule his dukedom, but effectively put the child duke under house arrest under heavy guard. Not even his wet nurses were allowed to stay with him. As a grown man, Ying did not even know of such common animals as cattle, horses, sheep, chickens, dogs, and pigs. Wang gave his granddaughter to the Duke of Ding'an in marriage. She was the daughter of his son Wang Yu (王宇), whom he had forced to commit suicide in 3 CE after Wang Yu, unhappy with his dictatorial rule, had conspired with Emperor Ping's uncles from the Wei clan in order to overthrow him. Other than this, not much is known about the Duke of Ding'an's life during the Xin dynasty.

== Death ==
After the Xin dynasty was overthrown in 23 CE and Wang Mang was killed, the imperial descendant Liu Xuan (劉玄) became emperor as the Gengshi Emperor. However, due to Emperor Gengshi's incompetence, conspiracies and rebellions arose throughout the empire, seeking to displace him.

In 25 CE, Fang Wang (方望), the former strategist for the local warlord Wei Xiao (隗囂), and a man named Gong Lin (弓林) kidnapped Liu Ying to recrown him and occupied Linjing (臨涇, in modern Qingyang, Gansu). In February or March 25, Emperor Gengshi sent the prime minister Li Song (李松) to attack and wiped out Fang Wang's rebel force, killing Liu Ying.

== Era names ==
- Jushe (居攝) February 6 CE – October 8 CE
- Chushi (初始) November 8 CE – January 9 CE

== Consorts ==
- Lady, of the Wang clan (王氏)

== See also ==
1. Family tree of the Han dynasty

Emperor Ruzi of Han House of Liu Born: 5 Died: 25
Regnal titles
Preceded by Emperor Ping of Han	Emperor of China; Western Han; 6–9 with Wang Mang (6–9)	Succeeded by Wang Mang
