= Chengyang Kingdom =

Kingdom of China's Han and Jin dynasties, located in southeastern Shandong

Chengyang Kingdom (Chinese: 城陽國) was a kingdom of China's Han and Jin dynasties, located in present-day southeastern Shandong.

Chengyang was originally a commandery in the Qi Kingdom of early Han dynasty. The territory was granted to Princess Yuan of Lu as her fief in 193 BC, but was returned to Qi in 179 BC. In 178 BC, Liu Zhang, a son of King Daohui of Qi, became the first King of Chengyang. The capital was Ju. Throughout the Western Han dynasty, a total of 53 marquessates was created on the territories of Chengyang and added to the neighboring commanderies. In late Western Han, the kingdom covered only 4 counties: Ju, Yangdu (陽都), Dong'an (東安) and Lü (虑). The population in 2 AD was 205,784 individuals, or 56,642 households. Zhang's descendants held the kingdom until Wang Mang's usurpation. After the restoration of Eastern Han, the kingdom was granted to Liu Zhi (劉祉), a relative of the Emperor Guangwu. Zhi died in 35 AD, and Chengyang was converted to a commandery. In 37, the commandery was merged into Langya.

In 198, Chengyang Commandery was recreated during Cao Cao's rule in 198 AD. After the foundation of Jin dynasty, Chengyang was again converted to a kingdom/principality and was successively granted to Sima Zhao (司馬兆), a brother of Emperor Wu of Jin, and later Sima Jing (司馬景) and Sima Xian (司馬憲), two sons of Emperor Wu.

== Kings ==
- Liu Zhang (劉章), King Jing (景) of Chengyang, 178–176 BC;
- Liu Xi (劉喜), King Gong (共) of Chengyang, 176–168 BC, 165–143 BC;
- Liu Yan (劉延), King Qing (頃) of Chengyang, 143–117 BC;
- Liu Yi (劉義), King Jing (敬) of Chengyang, 117–108 BC;
- Liu Wu (劉武), King Hui (惠) of Chengyang, 108–97 BC;
- Liu Shun (劉順), King Huang (荒) of Chengyang, 97–51 BC
- Liu Hui (劉恢), King Dai (戴) of Chengyang, 51–43 BC;
- Liu Jing (劉景), King Xiao (孝) of Chengyang, 43–19 BC;
- Liu Yun (劉雲), King Ai (哀) of Chengyang, 19–18 BC;
- Liu Li (劉俚), 16 BC – 9 AD;
- Liu Zhi (劉祉), 26–35 AD.
