= Lulin =

Rebellion movement against the Xin dynasty

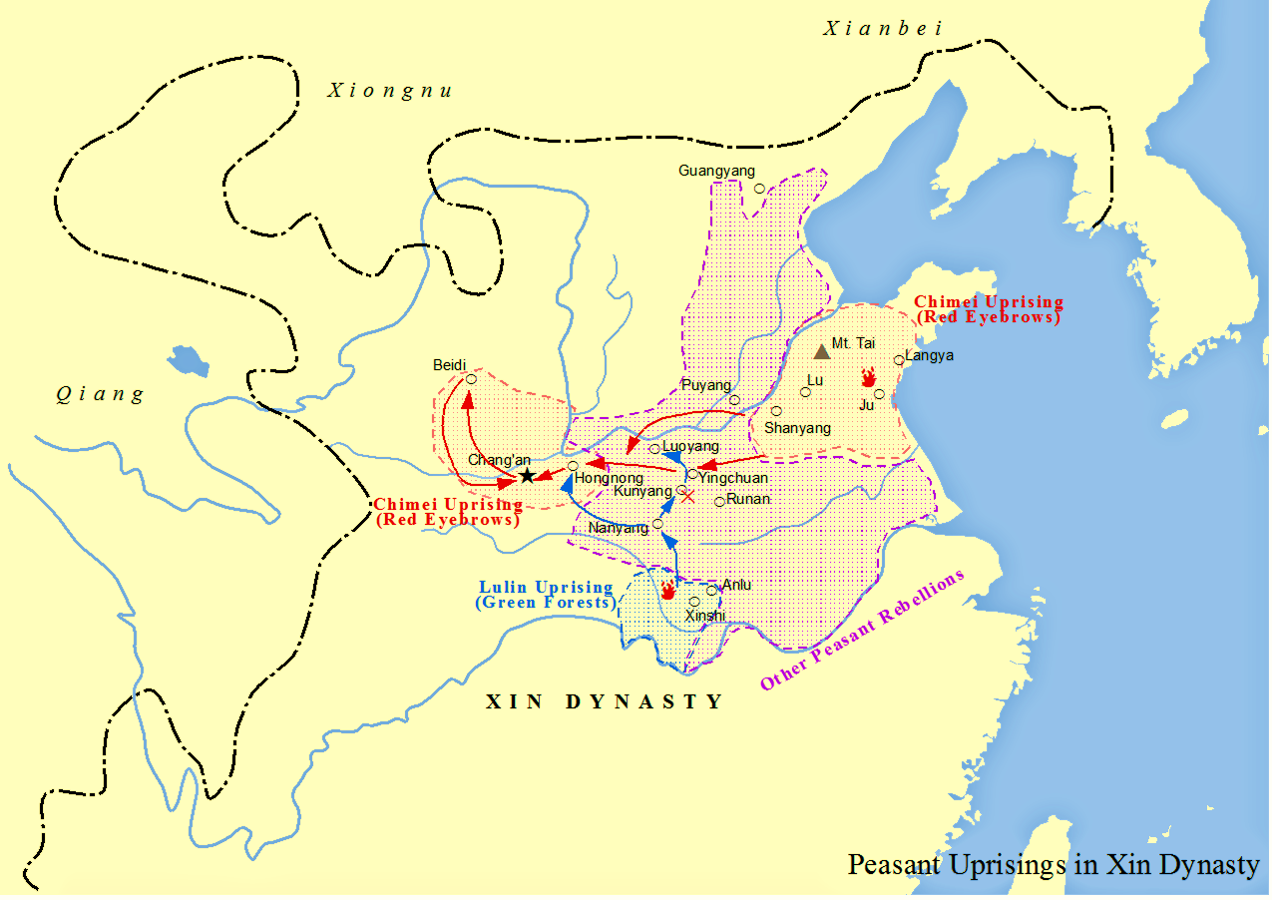
Map of peasant uprisings in Xin dynasty, including Lulin and Red Eyebrows rebellions

Lülin (Chinese: 绿林; pinyin: Lǜ Lín; lit. 'green forest') was one of two major peasant rebellions against Wang Mang's short-lived Xin dynasty in the modern southern Henan and northern Hubei regions. The name Lulin comes from the Lulin Mountains (in modern Yichang, Hubei), where the rebels had their stronghold for a while. Rebels from these two regions banded together to pool their strengths, and their collective strength eventually led to the downfall of the Xin dynasty and a temporary reinstatement of the Han dynasty with Liu Xuan (Gengshi Emperor) as the emperor.

Many Lülin leaders became important members of the Gengshi Emperor's government, but infighting and incompetence in governance (both of the emperor and his officials) led to the fall of the regime after only two years, paving the way for the eventual rise of Liu Xiu (Emperor Guangwu) of the Eastern Han dynasty.

== Start of the rebellion ==
In 17 AD, the Jing Province (荊州, modern Hubei, Hunan, and southern Henan) was suffering a famine that was greatly exacerbated by the corruption and incompetence of Xin officials. The victims of the famine were reduced to consuming wild plants, and even those were in short supply, causing the suffering people to attack each other.

Two men named Wang Kuang (王匡) and Wang Feng (王鳳), both from Xinshi (新市, in modern Jingmen, Hubei) became arbiters in some of these disputes, and they became the leaders of the enfamined people. They gathered local peasants in the Lulin Hills and formed the Lulin Army, which attacked landlords' estates to pillage food, and seized weapons from local troops.

They were later joined by many others, including Ma Wu (馬武), Wang Chang (王常), and Cheng Dan (成丹). Within a few months, 7,000 to 8,000 men gathered together under their commands. They had their base at Lulin Mountain, and their modus operandi was to attack and pillage villages far from the cities for food. This carried on for several years, during which they grew to tens of thousands in size.

Wang sent messengers issuing pardons in hopes of causing these rebels to disband. Once the messengers returned to the Xin capital Chang'an, some honestly reported that the rebels gathered because the harsh laws made it impossible for them to make a living and therefore they were forced to rebel. Some, in order to flatter Wang Mang, told him that these were simply evil resistors who needed to be killed, or that this was a temporary phenomenon. Wang listened to those who flattered him and generally relieved those who told the truth from their posts. Further, Wang made no further attempts to pacify the rebels, but instead decided to suppress them by force. In reality, the rebels were forced into rebellion to survive, and they were hoping that eventually, when the famine was over, they could return home to farm. As a result, they never dared to attack cities.

In 21 AD, the governor of Jing Province mobilized 20,000 soldiers to attack the Lulin rebels, and a battle was pitched at Yundu (雲杜), a major victory for the rebels, who killed thousands of government soldiers and captured their food supply and arms. When the governor tried to retreat, his retreat route was temporarily cut off by Ma Wu, but Ma Wu allowed him to escape, not wanting to offend the government more than the rebels have done already. Instead, the Lulin rebels roved near the area, capturing many women, and then returning to the Lulin Mountain. By this point, they had 50,000 men.

== Temporary breakup after plague ==
In 22 AD, the Lulin rebels suddenly suffered a serious plague of an unspecified nature, and at least 25,000 men died. This led to the breakup of the group into three "forces".

- Wang Chang and Cheng Dan moved to the west, toward Nan Commandery (roughly modern Jingzhou, Hubei); this branch was known as the Xiajiang Force (下江兵).
- Wang Feng, Wang Kuang, Ma Wu, and two other leaders Zhu Wei (朱鮪) and Zhang Ang (張卬) moved to the north, toward Nanyang Commandery (roughly modern Nanyang, Henan); this branch was known as the Xinshi Force (新市兵) (because the Wangs were both from Xinshi).
- Around this time, there was another nearby group of rebels led by Chen Mu (陳牧) and Liao Zhan (廖湛) known as the Pinglin Force (平林兵) because both Chen and Liao were from Pinglin (in modern Suizhou, Hubei).

These rebels at this time still generally lacked political ambition.

== Reunion and the start of political ambition ==
They were, however, soon spurred on by someone who was. Liu Yan, a descendant of a distant branch of the Han imperial clan, who lived in his ancestral territory of Chongling (舂陵, in modern Xiangyang, Hubei), had long been disgusted by Wang Mang's usurpation of the Han throne, and had long aspired to start a rebellion. He had a brother, Liu Xiu who, by contrast, was a careful and deliberate man, who was content to be a farmer. Around this time, there were prophecies being spread about that the Lius would return to power, and many men gathered about Liu Yan, requesting that he lead them. He agreed to do so. He then joined his forces with the Lulin's Xinshi and Pinglin Forces, and they captured a number of villages and pillaged them. In the winter of 22 AD, the ambitious Liu Yan then decided to make an initial assault against Wancheng, the capital of Nanyang Commandery, and he initially failed, suffering such a major loss at the hand of Zhen Fu (甄阜), the governor of Nanyang. His sister Liu Yuan (劉元) and brother Liu Zhong (劉仲) both died in the battle. Encouraged, Zhen then led his forces in pursuit, intending to crush the all Liu-Lulin rebels once and for all.

Alarmed, the Xinshi and Pinglin Forces began to consider withdrawing from the coalition and fleeing. At that time, however, the Xiajiang Force arrived nearby, and Liu was able to convince Wang Chang, who was respected by the other Xiajiang leaders, that Liu was a capable military leader. The Xiajiang Force therefore joined the coalition, and this led the Xinshi and Pinglin Forces to stay in the coalition.

Under Liu's command, the forces then made a surprise attack on Zhen's rear, seizing all of reserve food and arms of the government force. On the Chinese New Year of 23 AD, Liu crushed Zhen's forces and killed him and his assistant in battle. Encouraged by the victory, the Lulin leaders began to claim for themselves the title of generals, seize cities, create governmental organizations, and send out propaganda attacking Wang Mang.

== Restoration of Han under Gengshi Emperor ==
At this time, there were more and more calls within the army to support a descendant of the Han imperial house to be emperor. The soldiers under Liu Yan's direct command and the Xiajiang leaders all supported Liu. However, the leaders of the Xinshi and Pinglin Forces were deeply jealous and suspicious of Liu's strict discipline, and wanted to instead support someone weak. They found a minor leader within the Pinglin Force—a descendant of the Han imperial house who was a third cousin of Liu Yan, named Liu Xuan, who was claiming the title of General Gengshi (更始將軍) at the time. They decided to support Liu Xuan to be emperor, and Liu Yan, after initial opposition, decided to agree as well, not wanting to start a fight. In spring 23 AD, Liu Xuan was proclaimed emperor. Wang Kuang, Wang Feng, Zhu, Liu Yan, and Chen were the top officials in this new regime.

== Battle of Kunyang ==
Wang Mang decided that he had to crush this rebellion once and for all. He sent his cousin Wang Yi (王邑) and his prime minister Wang Xun (王尋) with what he considered to be overwhelming force, some 430,000 men, intending to crush the newly constituted Han regime. The Han forces were at this point in two groups—one led by Wang Feng, Wang Chang, and Liu Xiu, which, in response to the arrival of the Xin forces, withdrew to the small town of Kunyang (昆陽, in modern Ye County, Henan) and one led by Liu Yan, which was besieging Wancheng. The rebels in Kunyang initially wanted to scatter, but Liu Xiu opposed it; rather, he advocated that they guard Kunyang securely, while he would gather all other available troops in surrounding areas and attack the Xin forces from the outside. After initially rejecting Liu Xiu's idea, the Kunyang rebels eventually agreed.

Liu Xiu carried out his action, and when he returned to Kunyang, he began harassing the besieging Xin forces from the outside. Wang Yi and Wang Xun, annoyed, led 10,000 men to attack Liu Xiu and ordered the rest of their troops not to move from their siege locations. Once they engaged in battle, however, after minor losses, the other units were hesitant to assist them, and Liu Xiu killed Wang Xun in battle. Once that happened, the Han forces inside Kunyang burst out of the city and attacked the other Xin units, and the much larger Xin forces suffered a total collapse. The soldiers largely deserted and went home, unable to be gathered again. Wang Yi had to withdraw with only several thousand men back to Luoyang. Once the news about the Battle of Kunyang spread throughout the empire, the people rose everywhere else simultaneously, often killing the local government officials and claiming to be officials under the new Han regime. Within a month, nearly the entire empire slipped out of Xin control.

== Initial infighting and Liu Yan's death ==
Around the same time, Liu Yan was able to finally capture Wancheng. The Gengshi Emperor entered the city and made it his temporary capital.

However, the very first major incident of infighting in the Gengshi Emperor's regime would happen at this time. The Gengshi Emperor, along with the officials who were formerly leaders of the Xinshi and Pinglin Forces, was fearful of Liu Yan's capabilities and keenly aware that many of Liu Yan's followers were angry that he was not made emperor. One, Liu Ji (劉稷), was particularly critical of the Gengshi Emperor. The Gengshi Emperor arrested Liu Ji and wanted to execute him, but Liu Yan tried to intercede. The Gengshi Emperor took this opportunity to execute Liu Yan as well. However, ashamed of what he had done, he spared Liu Yan's brother Liu Xiu, and in fact made Liu Xiu the Marquess of Wuxin.

== Destruction of Wang Mang and subsequent movement to Chang'an ==
The Gengshi Emperor then commissioned two armies, one led by Wang Kuang, targeting Luoyang, and the other led by Shentu Jian (申屠建) and Li Song (李松), targeting Chang'an directly. All the populace on the way gathered, welcomed, and joined the Han forces. Shentu and Li quickly reached the outskirts of Chang'an. In response, the young men within Chang'an also rose up and stormed Weiyang Palace, the main imperial palace. Wang died in the battle at the palace.

After Wang Mang's death, the Gengshi Emperor moved his capital from Wancheng to Luoyang. He then issued edicts to the entire empire, promising to allow Xin local officials who submitted to him to keep their posts. For a brief period, nearly the entire empire showed at least nominal submission—even including the powerful Chimei (Red Eyebrows) general Fan Chong (樊崇), who, indeed, went to stay in Luoyang under promises of titles and honors. However, this policy was applied inconsistently, and local governors soon became apprehensive about giving up their power. Fan, in particular, left the capital and returned to his troops.

In AD 24, the Gengshi Emperor moved his capital again, back to the Western Han capital of Chang'an. The people of Chang'an had previously been offended by the Gengshi Emperor's officials (the former Lulin leaders), who did not appreciate their rising up against Wang Mang but in fact considered them traitors. Once the Gengshi Emperor was back in the capital, he issued a general pardon, which calmed the situation for a while. At this time, Chang'an was still largely intact, except for Weiyang Palace, destroyed by fire. However, the Gengshi Emperor's timidity quickly caused problems. When the imperial officials were gathered for an official meeting, the Gengshi Emperor, who had never seen such solemn occasions, panicked. Later, when generals submitted reports to him, he asked questions such as, "How much did you pillage today?" This type of behavior further reduced the confidence of the people in his administration.

Eventually, the Gengshi Emperor's incompetence (along with the incompetence of the officials he installed—mostly Lulin leaders) in governing even the territories around Chang'an but also elsewhere, caused the loyalty of the people in the outlying regions to peel away. By the end of AD 24, Liu Xiu, who had been sent by the Gengshi Emperor to pacify the region north of the Yellow River, was de facto independent, while the Chimei were approaching and readying for an attack on Chang'an.

== Destruction of the Gengshi Emperor's regime ==
In the summer of 25 AD, Liu Xiu finally made a formal break with the Gengshi Emperor, after his generals and the Gengshi Emperor's generals fought over control of the Henei and Luoyang regions. He declared himself emperor (establishing the regime known in historiography as the Eastern Han dynasty), and soon his general Deng Yu (鄧禹) also captured the modern Shanxi, further reducing the Gengshi Emperor's strength.

Feeling trapped, a number of the Gengshi Emperor's generals conspired to kidnap him and flee back to their home region of Nanyang. These conspirators included Zhang Ang, Liao Zhan, Hu Yin (胡殷), Shentu Jian (申屠建), and the warlord Wei Xiao (隗囂). They were discovered, and most were executed, but Zhang occupied most of Chang'an, forcing Gengshi Emperor to flee, just as Chimei forces were approaching. The Gengshi Emperor then made the further mistake of suspecting, without evidence, Wang Kuang, Chen Mu, and Cheng Dan of conspiring with Zhang; he executed Chen and Cheng by trickery, and Wang, in response, joined Zhang.

Generals still loyal to the Gengshi Emperor were eventually able to evict Zhang from the capital, but by that time the situation was desperate. Zhang and his allies surrendered to Chimei and, working with them, attacked Chang'an again, which fell quickly. The Gengshi Emperor fled, only followed by a few loyal followers. In the winter of 25 AD, he surrendered to the Chimei, and was eventually killed. Most Lulin leaders eventually became lost in obscurity, but some who were initially friendly with Liu Xiu joined him and became officials in his government. They were largely not given important posts, however, in his new dynasty.

The regime of the Gengshi Emperor has been termed the Xuan Han (玄漢) by historians, after the Gengshi Emperor's personal name Liu Xuan, in order to distinguish the numerous dynasties named "Han" in Chinese history. The Eastern Han established by the Emperor Guangwu, instead of the Xuan Han, is typically considered to be the legitimate restoration of the Han dynasty.
