= Liu Zhang (prince) =

Chinese prince and important figure in the anti-Lü clan conspiracy

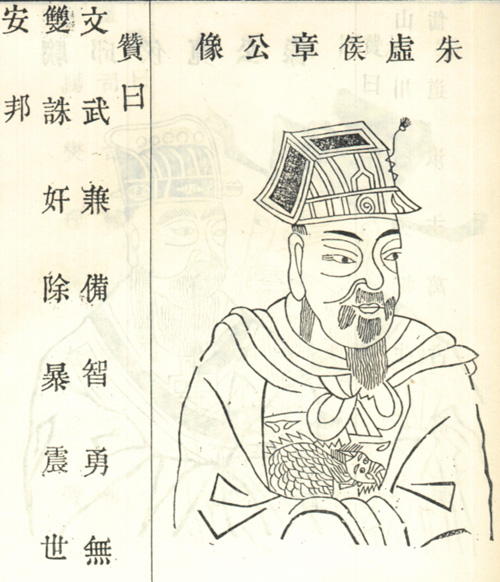
Liu Zhang

Liu Zhang (劉章) (died May or June 177 BC), formally Prince Jing of Chengyang (城陽景王), sometimes known in later historical accounts and literature by his earlier title, Marquess of Zhuxu (朱虛侯), was an important political figure in the anti-Lü clan conspiracy during the Lü Clan disturbance in 180 BC.

He is a son of Liu Fei (劉肥), and a grandson of the Han dynasty founder Liu Bang. He was created the Marquess of Zhuxu in 186 BC by Grand Empress Dowager Lü, who also gave him the hand of her nephew Lü Lu's daughter in marriage. Along with it, she also summoned him to the capital Chang'an to serve as an imperial guard commander.

After the destruction of the Lü Clan in 180 BC, Liu Zhang was initially promised the Principality of Zhao for his role in the conspiracy by the new emperor, Emperor Wen (Liu Heng). When, however, the new emperor became aware that Liu Zhang had initially wanted to make his brother Liu Xiang, the Prince of Qi as emperor instead of him, he became very displeased. The new emperor therefore denied Liu Zhang the larger Principality of Zhao and only created him the Prince of Chengyang (a smaller principality carved out of his brother's principality) in 178 BC. Even so, he was well loved in his principality for what was seen as a heroic role in overthrowing the Lü clan, and the people of his principality worshipped him as a god after his death.

Liu Zhang would be succeeded by his son Liu Xi(劉喜); Liu Penzi, a descendant of Liu Zhang, would later be crowned emperor by the Red Eyebrows, a militant group against Wang Mang.

Prince Jing of Chengyang House of Liu Died: 177 BC
Chinese royalty
New title	Prince of Chengyang; 180 BC – 177 BC	Succeeded by Liu Xi
