= Liu Penzi =

Han dynasty puppet emperor (born 10 AD)

- Born: 10 AD
- Died: After 27 AD
- Dynasty: Han dynasty
- Father: Liu Meng

Liu Penzi (Chinese: 劉盆子; 10 AD – after 27 AD) or Jianshi Emperor was a puppet emperor placed on the Han dynasty throne temporarily by the Red Eyebrows (Chimei) rebels after the collapse of the Xin dynasty, from 25 to 27 AD. Liu Penzi and his two brothers were forced into the Red Eyebrows as child soldiers. When the Red Eyebrows submitted to the new Gengshi Emperor, his older brother Liu Gong fled to support the new emperor. Later, the Red Eyebrows rose again in rebellion and chose Liu Penzi as emperor. When they took Chang'an, Liu Penzi was officially Emperor of China, but he never had actual powers. When Liu Xiu definitively defeated the Red Eyebrows, he spared the 17-year-old puppet emperor.

== Family background ==
Liu Penzi was a descendant of the Western Han prince Liu Zhang, Prince Jing of Chengyang, from whose principality many Chimei men came. The people of the principality had long worshipped Prince Jing as a god. Penzi's grandfather Liu Xian (劉憲) was created the Marquess of Shi by Emperor Yuan, and Penzi's father Liu Meng (劉萌) inherited the march after Marquess Xian's death. When Wang Mang usurped the Han throne and established the Xin dynasty in 8, the march was abolished.

Penzi was the youngest of three brothers. His older brothers were Liu Gong (劉恭) and Liu Mao (劉茂). As Chimei forces rose late during the Xin dynasty, the Liu brothers were forced into the Chimei to be child soldiers. Later, when the Chimei general Fan Chong (樊崇) temporarily submitted to Gengshi Emperor's authority after Gengshi Emperor overthrew Wang Mang, Liu Gong accompanied Fan to the capital, Luoyang, and was created the Marquess of Shi to inherit his father's title. He did not accompany Fan when Fan later fled from Luoyang back to the Chimei stronghold of Puyang (濮陽, in modern Puyang, Henan), but remained a follower of Gengshi Emperor. Mao and Penzi remained in the Chimei forces and were made cattlemen.

== As Emperor ==
As Chimei forces were on their way to overthrow the temporary Han emperor Gengshi Emperor in 25, they became convinced that they should find a descendant of Prince Zhang and make him emperor to inherit the Han throne. They found some 70 descendants of Liu Zhang, but only three were from the main line—the brothers Mao and Penzi, and another Liu Xiao (劉孝), the former Marquess of Xi'an. After drawing lots, Penzi was declared emperor. The 14-year-old Penzi was greatly scared when he saw all of the generals bow down to him, and he tried to destroy the lot he drew by chewing it in his mouth, but it was in vain; he was selected. Even after his selection, however, he had no power and remained a cattleman until the Chimei forces defeated Gengshi Emperor and entered the capital Chang'an later that year.

The Chimei generals were as inept at ruling as they were capable in the battlefield. Initially, the people of the Guanzhong (關中, modern central Shaanxi) region submitted and offered tributes, but were surprised when the Chimei soldiers continuously robbed them on the way to Chang'an. The locals soon resumed maintaining and defending their outposts.

In 26, Liu Gong, seeing the dangers of the situation for his brother the emperor, decided to make one attempt to either put the situation under control or disengage his brother from the mess. At the New Year's Day imperial gathering, Liu Gong first spoke and asked that Emperor Penzi be allowed to yield the throne, and Emperor Penzi jumped off the throne, took the imperial seal off himself, and spoke while crying:

"Now there is an emperor, but everyone continues to act as robbers. The people hate us and do not trust us. This is because you chose the wrong Son of Heaven. Please return my body to me. But if you want to kill me to divert blame, then I must die."

Fan and the other leaders were ashamed, and they left their seats and bowed down to Emperor Penzi, apologizing for their failures. They physically forced Emperor Penzi back onto the throne and put the imperial seal back onto him. For weeks after the incident, the generals restrained their soldiers from unlawful acts, and the people praised Emperor Penzi as a merciful and brilliant emperor. However, after some time elapsed, the lawlessness returned. Soon, the food supplies were completely depleted, and the Chimei forces burned many Chang'an palaces and other buildings and pillaged the city, then marched west into the modern eastern Gansu region.

Soon, the Chimei were repelled by the local warlord Wei Xiao (隗囂) and forced to retreat east. After battles of attrition against Liu Xiu (Emperor Guangwu)'s forces, they were completely drained, and they surrendered to him in spring 27. Emperor Penzi yielded his title, and Emperor Guangwu, aware that he did not have any actual powers, spared him.

== Post-surrender and death ==
Emperor Guangwu made Penzi an assistant to his uncle Liu Liang (劉良), the Prince of Zhao. Later, Liu Penzi suffered an illness that blinded him, and Liu Xiu gave him a large swath of farmland, allowing him to survive on the rent from the farms for the rest of his life.

He died after 27 AD, but the exact date of his death is currently unknown.

== Era name ==
- Jianshi (建始), 25–27

Emperor Penzi House of Liu
Titles in pretence
| Preceded by Gengshi Emperor | — TITULAR — Emperor of China; Chimei claimant 25–27; Reason for succession failure: Collapse of Chimei | Succeeded by Emperor Guangwu of Han |
