= Gengshi Emperor =

Emperor of Han China from 23 to 25 AD

Gengshi Emperor 更始帝
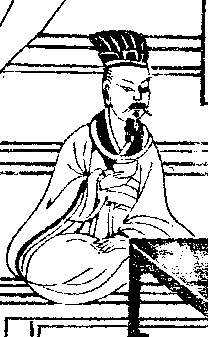

Emperor of the Han dynasty
- Reign: 5 October 23 – 5 August 25 AD
- Predecessor: Ruzi Ying (Western Han)
- Successor: Emperor Guangwu (Eastern Han)
- Died: 25 AD
- Burial: Baling
- Spouses: Consort Zhao; Consort Han; Consort Fan
Era dates
- Gengshi (更始; 23–25)
Posthumous name
- Prince of Huaiyang (淮陽王)
- Father: Liu Zizhang
- Mother: Lady He

Chinese name
- Chinese: 更始帝
- Hanyu Pinyin: Gēngshǐ dì
Transcriptions
Standard Mandarin
- Hanyu Pinyin: Gēngshǐ dì
- Wade–Giles: Keng^{1}-shih^{3} ti^{4}

Courtesy name
- Traditional Chinese: 聖公
- Simplified Chinese: 圣公
- Hanyu Pinyin: Shènggōng
Transcriptions
Standard Mandarin
- Hanyu Pinyin: Shènggōng

Personal name
- Traditional Chinese: 劉玄
- Simplified Chinese: 刘玄
- Hanyu Pinyin: Liú Xuán
Transcriptions
Standard Mandarin
- Hanyu Pinyin: Liú Xuán

The Gengshi Emperor (died c. November 25 AD), born Liu Xuan, was a Lülin leader and the 16th emperor of the Han dynasty that had been restored following the downfall of Wang Mang's short-lived Xin dynasty. He was also known by his courtesy name Shenggong and as the King or Prince of Huaiyang, a posthumous title bestowed upon him by Emperor Guangwu of the Eastern Han. The Gengshi Emperor was viewed as a weak and incompetent ruler, who briefly ruled over an empire willing to let him rule over them, but was unable to keep that empire together. He was eventually deposed by the Red Eyebrows and strangled a few months after his defeat.

Traditionally, historians treated his emperor status ambiguously: sometimes he would be referred to as the Gengshi Emperor, and sometimes by his posthumous title, Prince of Huaiyang. The regime of the Gengshi Emperor is known in historiography as the Xuan Han (玄漢), after his personal name Liu Xuan.

== Liu Yan and new emperor ==
Gengshi was a descendant of Emperor Jing of early Western Han dynasty, via the lineage of Liu Mai, Prince Ding of Changsha. His third cousin, Liu Yan, was a prominent general in the rebellions against the reign of Wang Mang in the short-lived Xin dynasty. In 22 AD, many rebel leaders were jealous of Liu Yan's capabilities despite many of their men admiring Liu Yan and wanting him to become the emperor of a restored Han dynasty. They found Liu Xuan, then another local rebel leader who was claiming the title of General Gengshi (更始將軍) at the time and was considered a weak personality, and requested that he be made emperor. Liu Yan initially opposed this move and instead suggested that Liu Xuan carry the title "King of Han" first (echoing the founder of the Han dynasty, Emperor Gaozu). The other rebel leaders refused, and on 11 March 23, Liu Xuan was proclaimed emperor. Liu Yan became prime minister.

== Infighting, defeat of Wang Mang and the capture of Chang'an ==
The first major incident involving infighting in the Gengshi Emperor's regime happened shortly after the Battle of Kunyang which would lead to the demise of Wang Mang and the Xin dynasty. The Gengshi Emperor was fearful of Liu Yan's capabilities and keenly aware that many of Liu Yan's followers were angry that Liu Yan was not made emperor. Liu Ji (劉稷), was particularly critical of the Gengshi Emperor. The emperor arrested Liu Ji and wanted to execute him, but Liu Yan tried to intercede. The emperor took Liu Yan's intercession as a justification to execute Liu Yan as well. Subsequently, ashamed of what he had done, he spared Liu Yan's brother Liu Xiu and honoured him by creating him Marquess of Wuxin.

The Gengshi Emperor then commissioned two armies, one led by Wang Kuang, targeting Luoyang, and the other led by Shentu Jian (申屠建) and Li Song (李松), targeting Chang'an directly. All the populace on the way gathered, welcomed, and joined the Han forces. Shentu and Li quickly reached the outskirts of Chang'an. In response, the young men within Chang'an also rose up and stormed Weiyang Palace, the main imperial palace. Wang died during the battle at the palace, as did his daughter Princess Huanghuang (the former empress of Han and widow of Emperor Ping). After Wang died, the crowd fought over the right to have the credit for having killed Wang, and many soldiers died in the ensuing fight. Wang's body was cut into pieces, and his head was delivered to the provisional Han capital Wancheng, to be hung on the city wall.

== Attempted consolidation of power ==
After Wang Mang's death, the Gengshi Emperor moved his capital from Wancheng to Luoyang. He then issued edicts to the entire empire, promising to allow Xin local officials who submitted to him to keep their posts. For a brief period, nearly the entire empire showed at least nominal submission, even including the powerful Chimei general Fan Chong (樊崇), who moved to Luoyang following promises of titles and honours. However, this policy was applied inconsistently, and local governors soon became apprehensive about giving up their power. Fan Chong soon left the capital and returned to his troops. In response, the Gengshi Emperor sent out his generals to try to calm the local governors and populace; these included Liu Xiu, who was sent to pacify the region north of the Yellow River. Soon the people began to see that the powerful officials around the Gengshi Emperor were in fact uneducated men lacking ability to govern; this made them lose confidence in the emperor's government.

The Gengshi Emperor's government was challenged by a major pretender in winter 23 AD. A fortuneteller in Handan named Wang Lang claimed to be actually named Liu Ziyu (劉子輿) and a son of Emperor Cheng. He claimed that his mother was a singer in Emperor Cheng's service, and that Empress Zhao Feiyan had tried to kill him after his birth, but that a substitute child was killed instead. After he spread these rumours, the people of Handan believed that he was a genuine son of Emperor Cheng, and the commanderies north of the Yellow River quickly pledged allegiance to him as emperor. Liu Xiu was forced to withdraw to the northern city of Jicheng (modern Beijing). After some difficulties, however, Liu Xiu was able to unify the northern commanderies still loyal to the Gengshi Emperor and besiege Handan in 24 AD, killing Wang Lang. The Gengshi Emperor put Liu Xiu in charge of the region north of the Yellow River and created him the Prince of Xiao, but Liu Xiu, still aware that he was not truly trusted and angry about his brother's death, secretly planned to break away from the Gengshi Emperor's rule. He put in place a strategy to strip other imperially-commissioned generals of their powers and troops, and then concentrated the troops under his own command.

The Gengshi Emperor moved his capital again, this time back to the Western Han capital of Chang'an. The people of Chang'an had previously been offended by the emperor's officials, who did not appreciate their rising up against Wang Mang but rather considered them traitors. Once the Gengshi Emperor was back in the capital, he issued a general pardon, which calmed the situation for a while. At this time, Chang'an was still largely intact, except for Weiyang Palace which had been destroyed by fire. However, the Gengshi Emperor's timidity quickly caused problems. When the imperial officials gathered for an official meeting, the emperor, who had never seen or been trained for such solemn occasions, seemed frightened and uncomfortable. Later, when generals submitted reports to him, he asked questions such as, "How much did you pillage today?" This type of behavior further reduced the people's confidence in him.

The emperor entrusted his government to Zhao Meng (趙萌), whose daughter he took as an imperial consort. The emperor engaged in frequent drinking and was often unable to receive officials or make important decisions. In the meantime Zhao greatly abused his power. So when an honest official finally revealed Zhao's crimes to the Gengshi Emperor, the emperor had him executed. The other powerful officials also greatly abused their power causing great confusion and anger.

In the autumn of 24 AD, the Gengshi Emperor sent his generals Li Bao (李寶) and Li Zhong (李忠) to try to capture modern Sichuan, then held by the local warlord Gongsun Shu (公孫述), but his generals were defeated by Gongsun.

== Defeat by the Chimei (Red Eyebrows) ==
In the winter of 24 AD, there was an ominous development. The Chimei troops stationed at Puyang were weary and wanted to go home. Their leaders felt that if they did so, Chimei forces would scatter and would be unable to be gathered again when needed. So, to give them a purpose for remaining together, their leaders decided to announce that they were attacking the imperial capital Chang'an, divided the troops into two armies and then headed west.

Liu Xiu, while he had a fairly strong force at his disposal, chose to stand by and wait for the Chimei to destroy the Gengshi Emperor. Liu Xiu used the Henei region (modern northern Henan, north of the Yellow River) as his base of operations because of its strategic location. The Chimei armies met up at Hongnong (弘農, in modern Sanmenxia, Henan), and defeated the armies that the emperor sent to stop them.

In 25 AD, Fang Wang (方望), the former strategist for the local warlord Wei Xiao (隗囂), and Gong Lin (弓林) led a force of several thousand men to occupy Linjing (臨涇, in modern Qingyang, Gansu) and kidnapped the former Western Han pretender Liu Ying to restore him. The Gengshi Emperor sent the chancellor Li Song (李松) to attack and kill Liu Ying.

In the summer of 25, Liu Xiu finally made a formal break with the emperor, after his forces and those of the emperor fought over control of the Henei and Luoyang regions. Liu Xiu declared himself emperor, establishing the regime known later as the Eastern Han Dynasty. His general Deng Yu then captured Shanxi, further reducing the Gengshi Emperor's strength. Feeling trapped, a number of the emperor's generals conspired to kidnap him and flee back to their home region of Nanyang in modern-day Henan. Their plan was uncovered and many were executed. However, one general, Zhang Ang (張卬) occupied most of Chang'an, forcing the Gengshi Emperor to flee, just as the Chimei forces were approaching.

In the meantime, the Chimei decided that they also needed their own emperor. They found three descendants of Liu Zhang, Prince of Chengyang, who had been very popular with the people of his principality (where many Chimei soldiers came from) and who was worshipped as a god after his death. After drawing lots, the youngest of Liu Zhang's descendants, the 15-year-old Liu Penzi was chosen and declared emperor. However, the young "emperor" was not given any power. Rather, he was effectively a puppet of the Chimei army.

Generals still loyal to the Gengshi Emperor were eventually able to evict Zhang Ang from the capital, but by that time the situation was desperate. Zhang and his allies surrendered to the Chimei and, working with them, attacked Chang'an, which fell quickly. The emperor fled, followed by his few remaining loyal followers, including Liu Zhi (劉祉) the Prince of Dingtao and Liu Gong (劉恭) the Marquess of Shi (Liu Penzi's elder brother). They were eventually made prisoners by one of the Gengshi Emperor's generals, Yan Ben (嚴本), who, planned to hold them as bargaining chips. When Liu Xiu heard about the fall of Chang'an, he created the emperor Prince of Huaiyang, in absentia, and decreed that anyone who harmed the Prince of Huaiyang would be severely punished and that anyone who delivered him to Eastern Han would be rewarded. (This appears to be basically political propaganda on Liu Xiu's part.) When news of Chang'an's fall arrived in Luoyang, the city surrendered to Liu Xiu, who entered the city and made it his capital.

In the winter of 25 AD, after being held by Yan Ben for a few months, the Gengshi Emperor realised that his situation was futile and requested Liu Gong to negotiate surrender terms. A promise was made that he would be made the Prince of Changsha. Emperor Penzi's general Xie Lu (謝祿) arrived at Yan's camp and escorted the Gengshi Emperor back to Chang'an to offer his seal (seized from Wang Mang) to Emperor Penzi. However, the Chimei generals, notwithstanding the earlier promise, wanted to execute him. It was only Liu Gong's final intercession (he threatened to commit suicide at the execution site) that allowed the Gengshi Emperor to be spared and he was created the Prince of Changsha. However, the Gengshi Emperor was forced to stay in Xie Lu's headquarters, with Liu Gong protecting him.

The Chimei generals were even less able to govern the capital than the emperor, because they were unable to control their soldiers from pillaging from the people. The people began to yearn for the return of the Gengshi Emperor. Zhang Ang and his allies, afraid of what might happen if the emperor returned to power, persuaded Xie Lu to strangle him. Liu Gong hid his body in a secure location, and years later, after Eastern Han had completely captured the Chang'an region, Liu Xiu had the Gengshi Emperor's body buried with princely honours at Baling (霸陵), near the tomb of Emperor Wen.

== Family ==
- Father: Liu Zizhang (劉子張), grandson of Liu Xiongqu (劉熊渠) the Marquess of Chonglin, the grandson of Liu Fa (劉發), Prince Ding of Changsha, the son of Emperor Jing of Han
- Mother: Lady He

Major Concubines

- Consort Zhao, the daughter of Zhao Meng (趙萌)
- Consort Han
- Consort Fan

Children

- Liu Qiu (劉求), later created Marquess of Xiangyi by Liu Xiu
- Liu Xin (劉歆), later created Marquess of Gushu by Liu Xiu
- Liu Li (劉鯉), later created Marquess of Shouguang by Liu Xiu

The Gengshi Emperor House of Liu Died: 25
Titles in pretence
Preceded by Wang Mang	— TITULAR — Emperor of China; 23–25; Reason for succession failure: Defeated by Chimei	Succeeded by Emperor Guangwu of Han
Preceded by Wang Mang	— TITULAR — Emperor of China; 23–25; Reason for succession failure: Defeated by Chimei	Succeeded by Liu Penzi
