= Military of the Han dynasty =

Imperial Chinese army

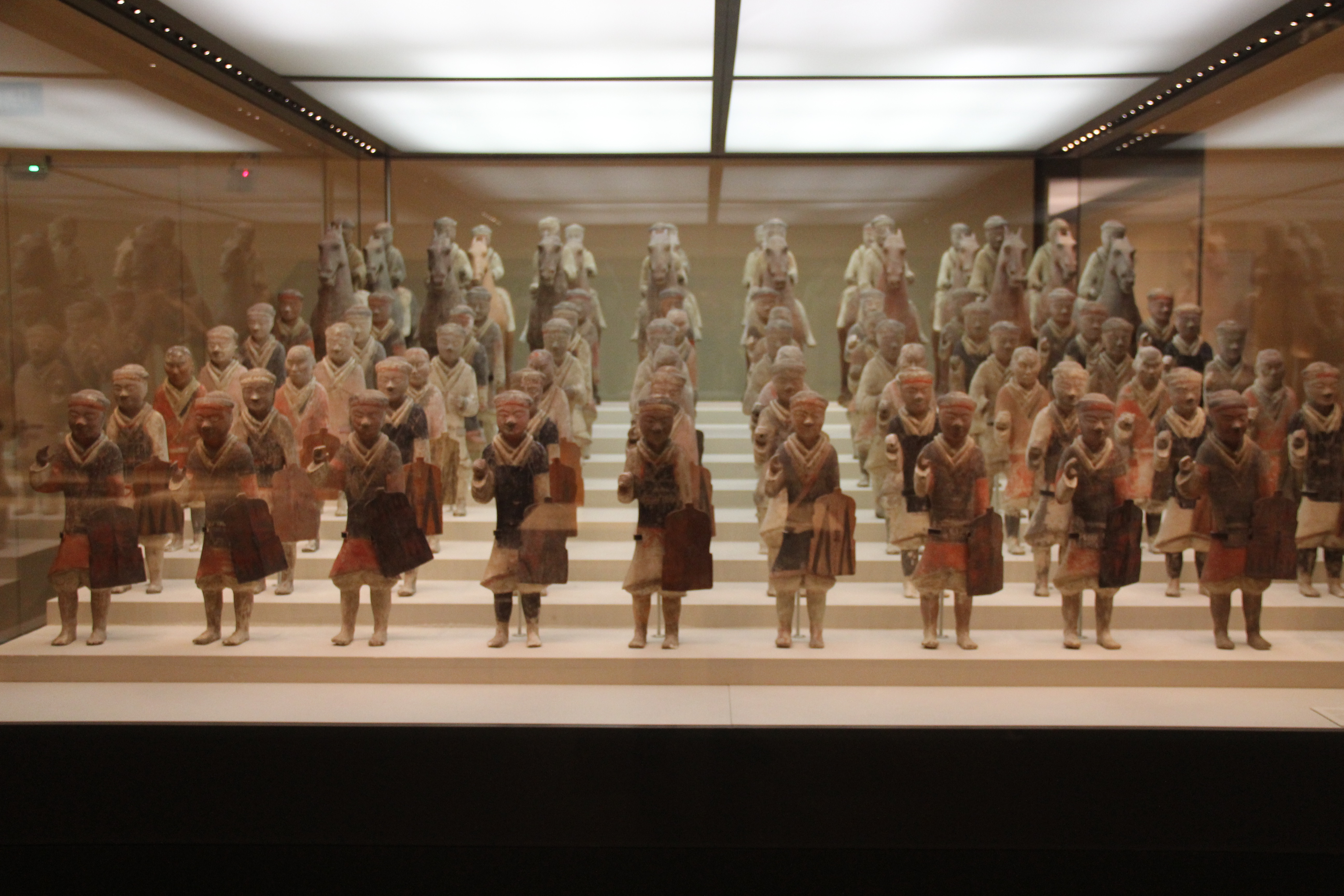
Han dynasty tomb figurines of soldiers

The military of the Han dynasty was the military apparatus of China from 202 BC to 220 AD, with a brief interregnum by the reign of Wang Mang and his Xin dynasty from 9 AD to 23 AD, followed by two years of civil war before the reestablishment of the Han dynasty. Han armies consisted primarily of infantry and cavalry, with minor use of chariots that became obsolete during the Western Han (202 BC – 9 AD). The Han naval forces included marines on tower ships built for inland riverine and lake battles rather than overseas ventures.

To the north along the eastern Eurasian Steppe, the Han dynasty fought against nomadic confederations such as the Xiongnu, Xianbei, and Wuhuan. To challenge these migratory peoples effectively, the Han Empire was compelled to develop, train, and supply large amounts of cavalry and mounted forces. The Han-Xiongnu Wars that began during the reign of Emperor Gaozu of Han reached a turning point during the reign of Emperor Wu of Han, whose forces pushed the rival Xiongnu westward with the conquest of the Gansu corridor and establishment of the Protectorate of the Western Regions over the Tarim Basin of Central Asia. Weapons such as the crossbow gave Han forces a slight advantage against armies that lacked them.

== Organization ==
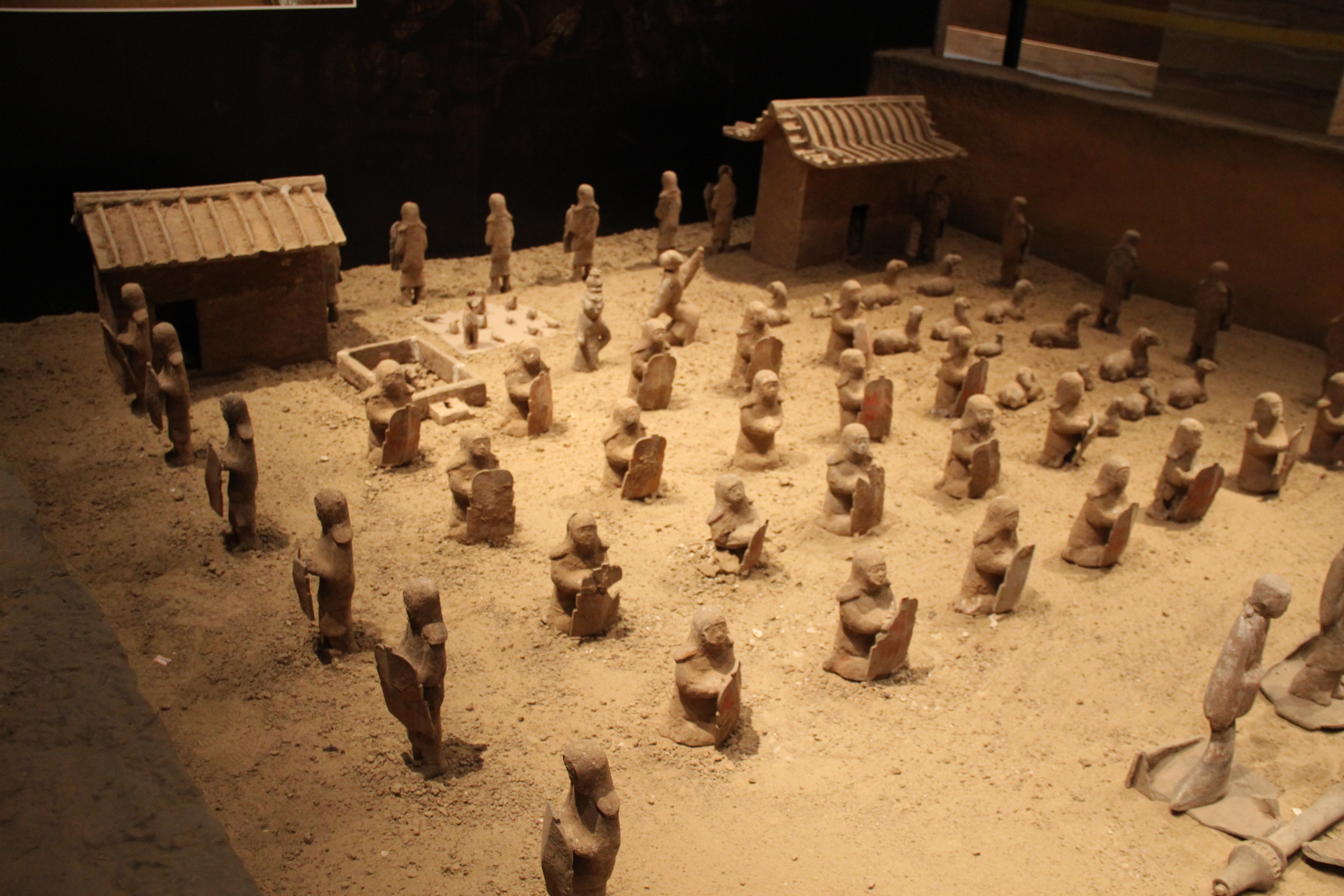
Han shieldbearers

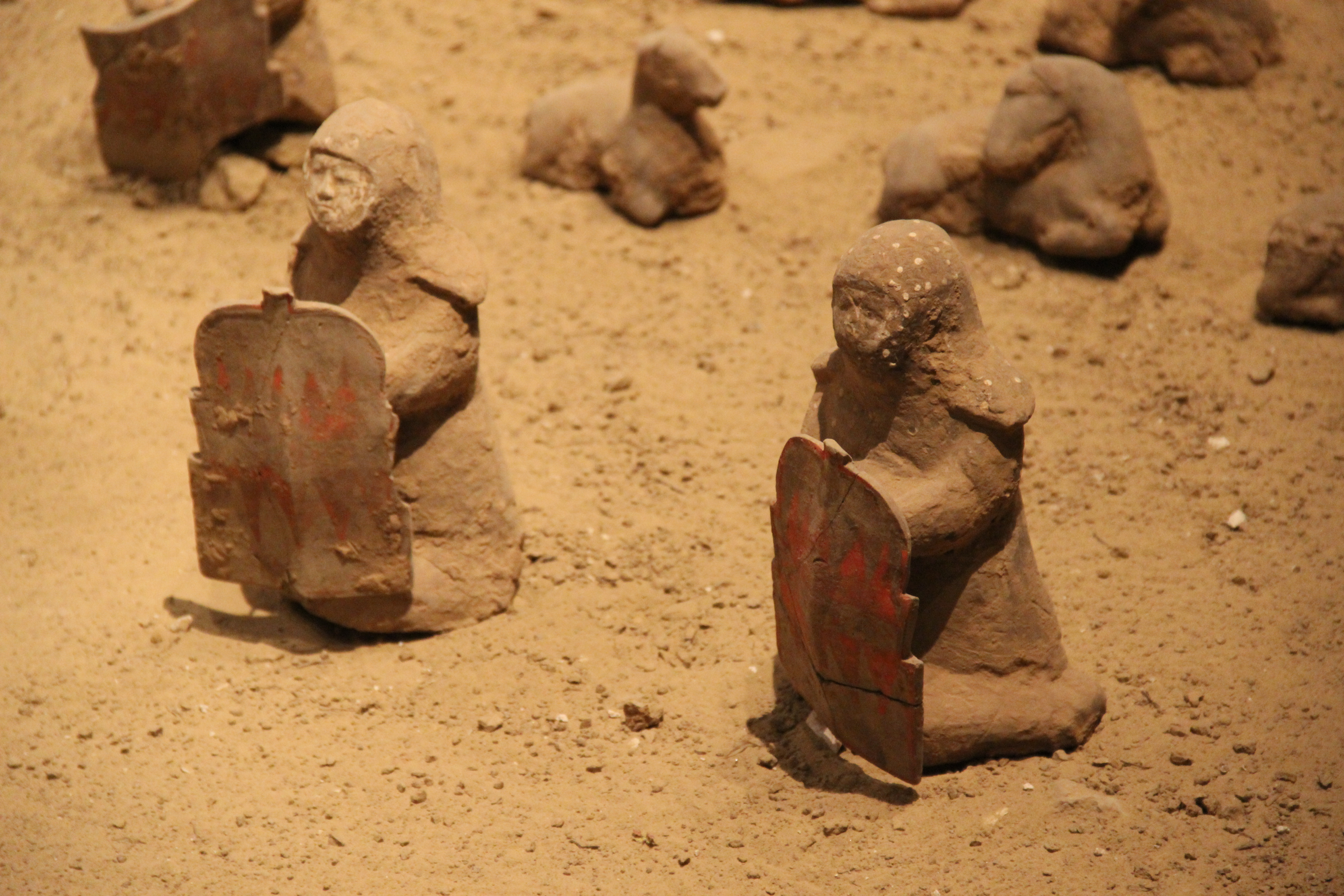
Han shieldbearers

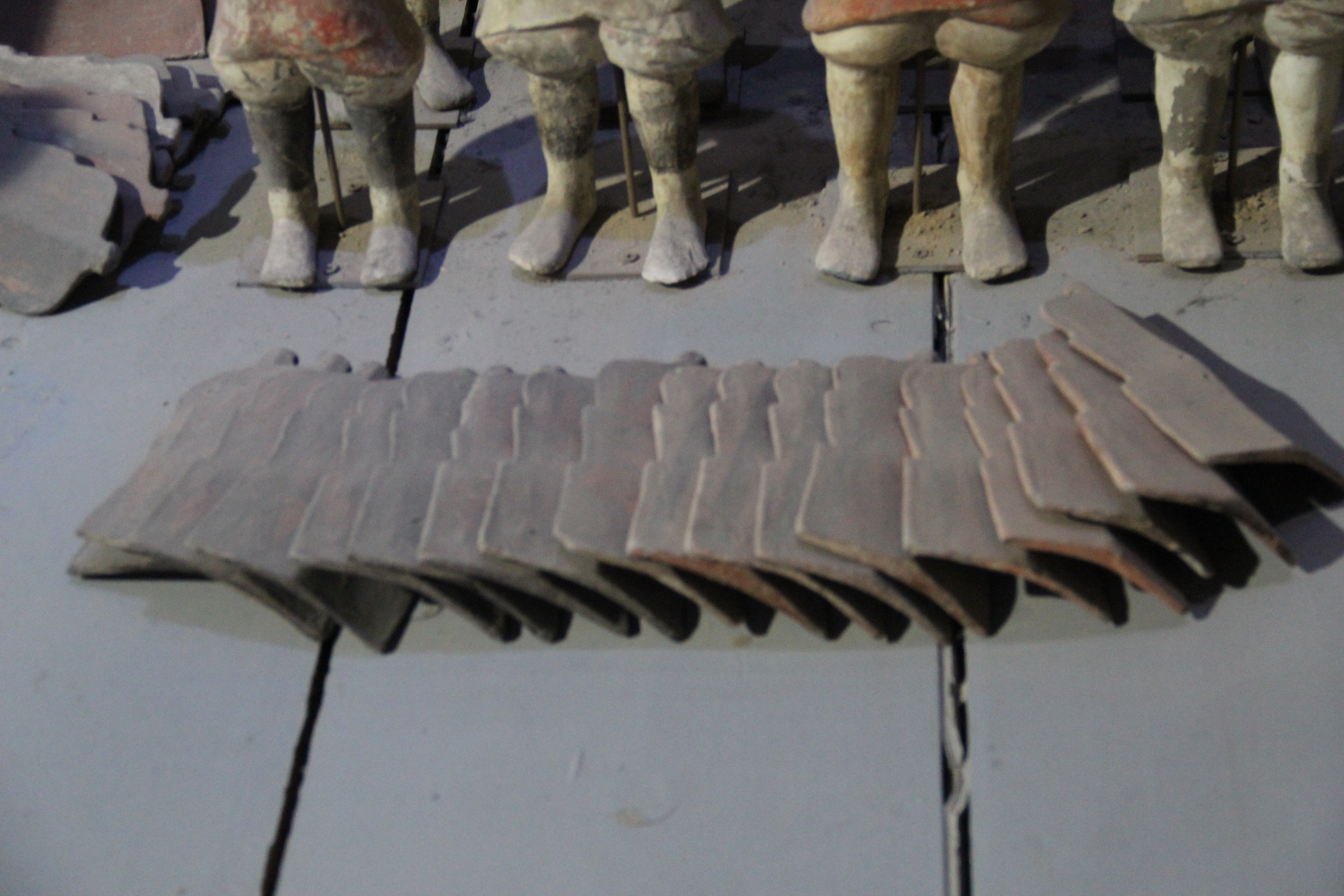
Miniature models of Han shields

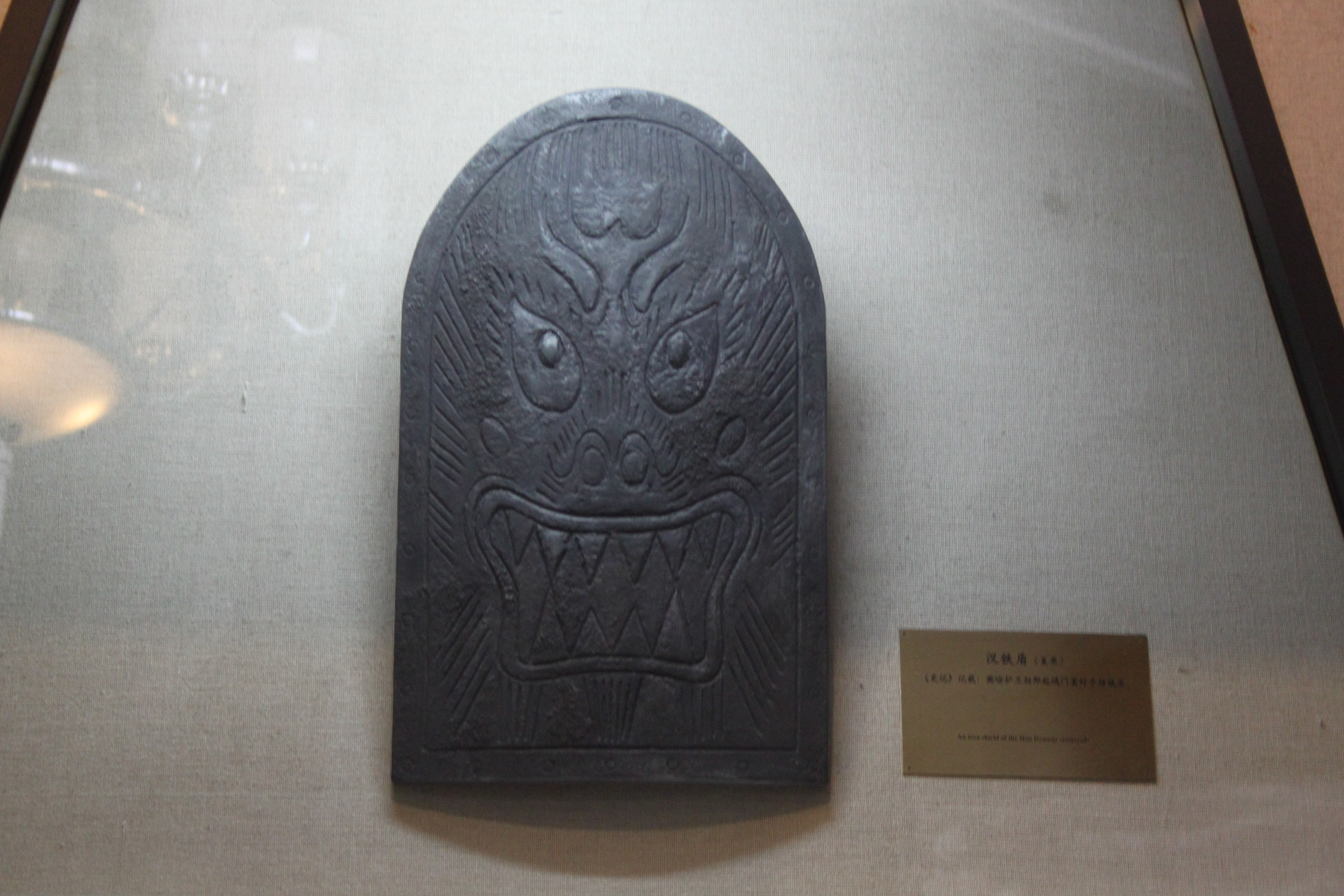
Restored Han iron shield

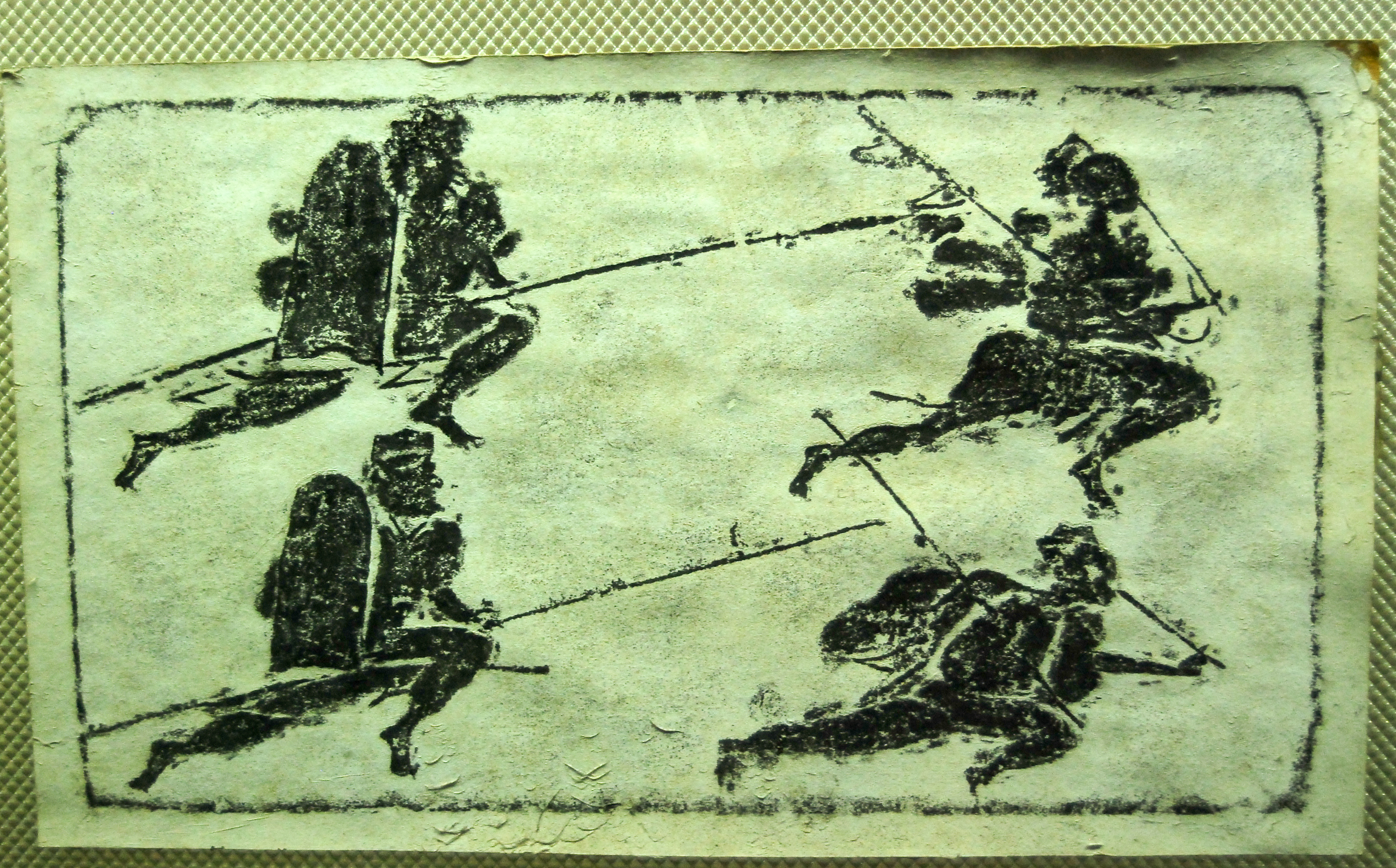
Late Eastern Han/Three Kingdoms shieldbearers

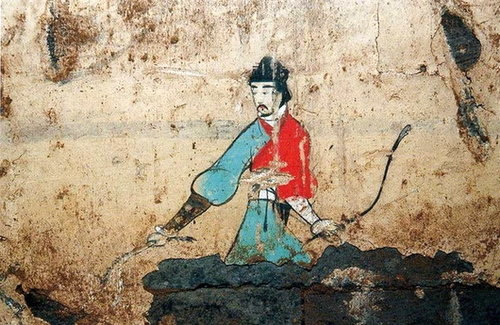
Han archer

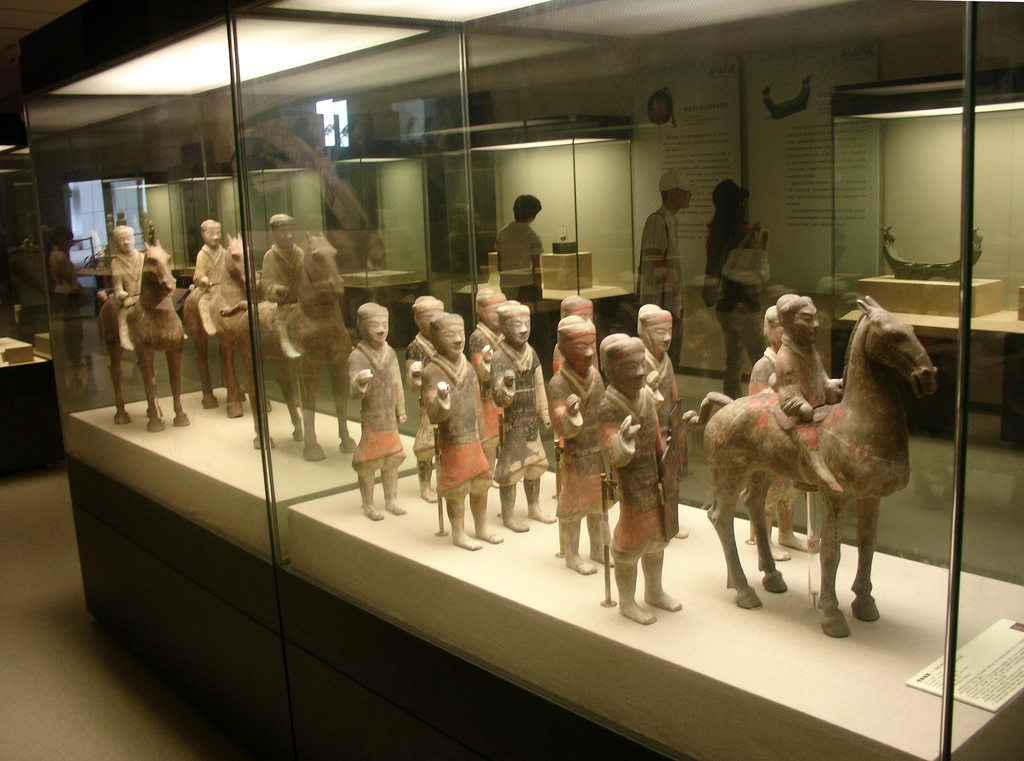
Western Han soldiers

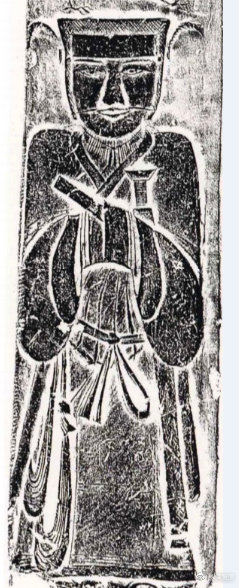
Han military official. The "Wuguan"(武冠) hat with pheasant-tail decorations denominates martial status.

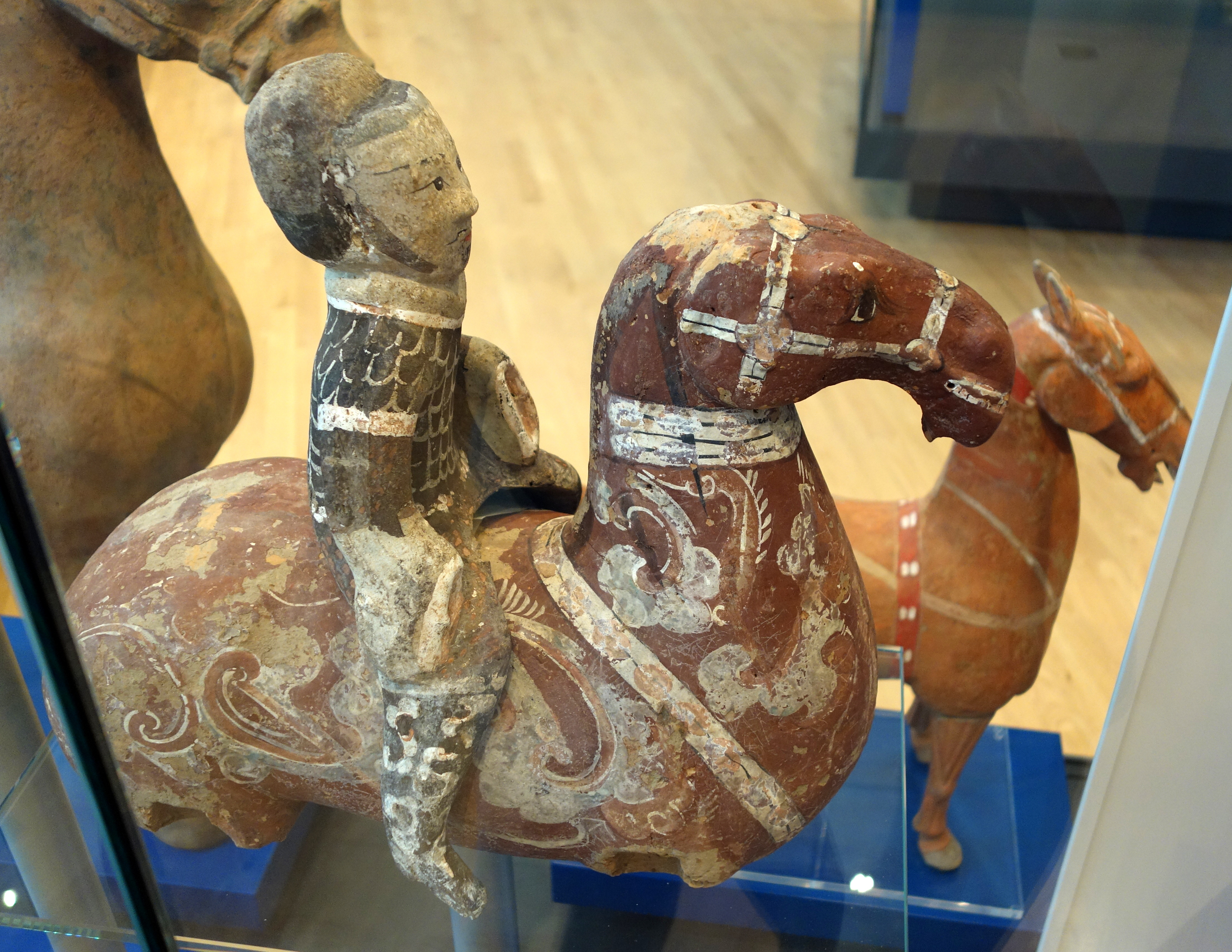
Han cavalry

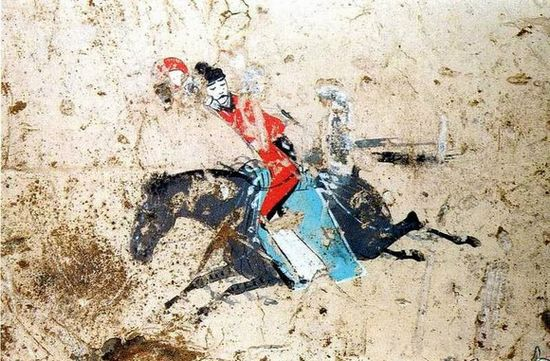
Han horseman during a hunt

=== Recruitment and training ===
At the start of the Han dynasty, male commoners were liable for conscription starting from the age of 23 until the age of 56. The minimum age was lowered to 20 after 155 BC, briefly raised to 23 again during the reign of Emperor Zhao of Han (r. 87–74 BC), but returned to 20 afterwards. Some convicts could choose to commute their service by serving on the frontier. Conscripts trained for one year and then served for another year either on the frontier, in one of the provinces, or at the capital as guards. A relatively small minority of these conscripts would also have served in the cavalry division in the north, which was primarily composed of volunteers from families of superior status, or waterborne forces in the south. Conscripts were generally trained to arrange themselves in a formation five men deep, but actual practice on the battlefield could be flexible, with some commanders preferring ranks of up to 10 men deep. Implementation of daily best practices was also highly dependent on each commander, with some like Li Guang eschewing administrative details while Cheng Buzhi always kept his men in tight formations. After finishing their two years of service, the conscripts were discharged. During Western Han times, discharged conscripts could still be called up for training once a year, but this practice was discontinued after 30 AD.

Certain nobles were exempt from military conscription. Those of ranks four to eight did not have to perform service in their locality, and those of rank 9 and higher had full exemptions. During the Eastern Han period, commoners were allowed to commute military service by paying a scutage tax.

=== Professional and Semi-Professional Armies ===
During the reign of Emperor Wu of Han, the standing army was significantly increased to face the military challenges presented by the Xiongnu during the Han–Xiongnu Wars and other opponents during the Southward expansion of the Han Dynasty. The number of cavalry forces was also significantly increased. The Han military by this time mostly favored longer-serving professional and semi-professional troops over troops that were regularly rotated and retired after a short length of service:

The total number of men eligible for the military draft was in the range of 13 to 15 million (corresponding to about 30 percent of the total population), and there was a standing army of 400,000 men in Wu-ti's early reign. Most important, as will be discussed later, at least 80,000 to 100,000 of the Han soldiers were cavalrymen-the future primary weapon of the Hsiung-nu campaigns and that number grew to 200,000 to 250,000 before 124 B.C. Afterward the total Han standing army would number 600,000 to 700,000 men, including about 300,000 cavalrymen, of which over 400,000 were professional soldiers, who had replaced the conscripts.

— Chun-shu Chang

Garrison troops and armies in the provinces and frontiers were often professional or semi-professional military colonists. These soldiers were stationed on the frontier and served in the military in return for a land allotment. This land was often in the frontier itself, and created a self-sustaining system where the soldiers and retired soldiers would be able to farm land that would produce the food that would feed their armies and local populace. The difference between military colonies and agricultural colonies was that the former provided regular military service as well as grain, whereas the latter only provided grain and/or taxes.

The efficiency of these garrisons was kept at a high professional standard. Officers arbitrated disputes between servicemen, who could plead for the recovery of debts. In the orderly rooms of the companies meticulous records were kept of the daily work on which men were engaged; of the preparation, dispatch, and receipt of official mail; of the regular tests in archery to which officers were subject; and of the inspectors’ reports on the state of efficiency of sites and equipment. Accurate timekeeping was a feature of service life, as may be seen, for example, in the records of schedules for the delivery of mail; of the observation of routine signals; and of the passage of individuals through points of control. Similarly, careful accounts were kept of the official expenditure and distribution of supplies; of payments made for officers' stipends or for the purchase of stores such as glue, grease, or cloth; of the rations of grain and salt to which men and their families were entitled; of the receipt of equipment and clothing by the men; and of the equipment, weapons, and horses consigned to the care of the units.

— Twitchett & Michael Lowe

During the time of Emperor Wu of Han, people of low reputation and/or low economic class who were initially conscripted often stayed in the military as a way to advance their social and economic status. This included paroled convicts, pardoned criminals, juvenile delinquents, etc. This created another subclass of professional or semi-professional troops that numbered at least 150,000 soldiers by 97 BC, making them a considerable percentage of the 500,000 to 700,000 troops that made up the Han standing army:

In a long historical perspective, the rise of a professional army under Han Wu-Ti changed the societal perception of the soldier (and the military). While the officers and elite of the Han military became an influential power group in the government, at the same time a large segment of the Han military rank and file were "lowly elements" of the Han society. In the campaigns of 111, 104, and 97 B.C, for example, more than 130,000 paroled convicts and pardoned criminals, juvenile delinquents, hoodlums, and men of bad reputation and undesirable social station were drafted into the army to perform different functions. It is clear that these men would stay in the military after the campaigns, if they survived, and become "professional" soldiers. Together with similar elements in other campaigns, such as the conquests of the Southern Yueh and Southwestern 1 in 112 BC and of Korea in 109 BC, the Han army would have had at least 150,000 such soldiers in its professional ranks by 97 BC. And there is no indication in Han Dynasty sources that the army ever went back to the rotating conscription of soldiers from men of regular social station (liang-min); the conscription system was replaced by a professional army. In either case, 150,000 men was a considerable percentage of the Han standing army of 500,000 to 600,000 men, and later 600,000 to 700,000, large enough to change the general perception and image of the Han army among the populace. The army now was an asylum for men of lowly social station and other undesirable elements of society, and military service was no longer mandatory.

— Chun-shu Chang

The Northern Army was a professional, full-time military force responsible for guarding the outer perimeter of the capital since 180 BC. It originally consisted of eight regiments and around 8,000 troops, but was later reorganized from 31 to 39 AD into a smaller force of five regiments, around 4,200 troops. The five regiments were each commanded by a colonel: the colonel of garrison cavalry, the colonel of picked cavalry, the colonel of infantry, the colonel of Chang River, and the colonel of archers. A captain of the center inspected the Northern Army and their encampments.

The Southern Army was established in 138 BC, consisting of 6,000 troops, to defend the imperial palace.

In 188 AD, the Army of the Western Garden was created as a counterweight to the Northern Army.

The total number of soldiers protecting the capital in the Eastern Han, amounted to some 20,000 soldiers.

Command structure of the Northern Army in 39 AD
Army (軍 jun)	Inspector	Commander	Regiment (部 bu)	Troops
Northern Army (北軍 beijun)	Captain of the center (北軍中候 beijun zhonghou)	Colonel (校尉 xiaowei)	Picked cavalry (越騎 yueji)	900
Northern Army (北軍 beijun)	Captain of the center (北軍中候 beijun zhonghou)	Colonel (校尉 xiaowei)	Garrison cavalry (屯騎 tunji)	900
Northern Army (北軍 beijun)	Captain of the center (北軍中候 beijun zhonghou)	Colonel (校尉 xiaowei)	Archers who shoot at sound (射聲 shesheng)	900
Northern Army (北軍 beijun)	Captain of the center (北軍中候 beijun zhonghou)	Colonel (校尉 xiaowei)	Foot soldiers (步兵 bubing)	900
Northern Army (北軍 beijun)	Captain of the center (北軍中候 beijun zhonghou)	Colonel (校尉 xiaowei)	Chang River (長水 changshui)	900

Other establishments and titles
Title	Function	Troops
Bearer of the gilded mace (執金吾 zhijinwu)	Capital police	2,000 cavalrymen 1,000 halberdiers
Colonel of the city gates (城門校尉 chengmen xiaowei)	Gate garrisons	2,000
Rapid as tigers (虎賁 huben)	Hereditary guard	1,500
Feathered Forest (羽林 yulin)	Recruits from the sons and grandsons of fallen soldiers	1,700

=== Officers ===
Neither the Qin or Han armies had permanent generals or field commanders. They were chosen from court officials on an ad hoc basis and appointed directly by the emperor as the need arose. At times several generals were given control of expeditionary forces to prevent any one general from obtaining overwhelming power and rebelling. A general's stipends were equivalent or slightly below that of the Nine Ministers, but in the case of failure on campaign, a general could face very severe penalties such as execution. Smaller forces were led by a colonel (xiaowei)

Command structure of the Han army on campaign
General (將軍 jiangjun)	Lieutenant-general (偏將軍 pian jiangjun); Commandant (都尉 duwei)	Colonel (校尉 xiaowei)	Major (司馬 sima)	Captain of the army (軍候 junhou)	Platoon chief (屯長 tunzhang)

=== Logistics ===
According to Zhao Chongguo who served in the first century BC, a force of 10,281 men required 27,363 hu of grain and 308 hu of salt each month, requiring a convoy of 1,500 carts for transport. One hu is 19.968 liters, meaning that each soldier required per month 51.9 liters of grain and 0.6 liters of salt. Another document at Juyan suggests 3.2 hu, or 63.8 liters, of grain.

Maintaining a massive standing army and launching military campaigns was very expensive for the government of the Han Dynasty. The Han Dynasty government under Emperor Wu of Han had to create new taxes, impose government monopolies over salt and iron, and sell aristocratic ranks in order to obtain sufficient funding because the existing sources of government revenues were insufficient:

It has been estimated that in Han Wu-ti's time the average annual cost of supporting an infantryman (foot soldier) was about 10,000 in cash and of a cavalryman (horse soldier) with his fighting horse about 87,000 cash, which included all the clothing, weapons, protective equipment, and feed for the horse except the grain provisions for the soldier, which were estimated at an average of 36 shih a year. Following these estimates, if the Han standing army in the 120s B.C. contained 600,000 men (with 300,000 foot soldiers and 300,000 horse soldiers) the total annual cost would be 29.1 billion in cash. If it contained 700,000 men (with 400,000 foot soldiers and 300,000 horse soldiers), the total annual cost would be at 40.1 billion. And if the combination was 600,000 men with 400,000 foot soldiers and 200,000 horse soldiers, the total annual cost would be 21.4 billion. Comparing these totals of the Han annual cost of keeping its standing army to its annual cash revenue of 12 billion, the cost is 2.43, 3.35, and 1.78 times the annual revenue, respectively. If the 8 billion revenue of Privy Treasury is counted as part of the government revenue (for a total of 20 billion), then the ratios would still be 1.46, 2.00, and 1.07.

— Chun-shu Chang

=== Decline ===
When imperial authority collapsed after 189 AD, military governors reverted to relying upon their personal retainers as troops. Due to the ensuing chaos of the Three Kingdoms period, there was no need for conscription since displaced peoples voluntarily enlisted in the army for security reasons. The end of the Han dynasty system of recruitment eventually led to the rise of a hereditary military class by the beginning of the Jin dynasty (266–420).

The internecine conflicts that dominated the Chinese scene during the century after 180 transformed the economy and gave rise to new relationships between elite families and the farming population; they greatly weakened, but did not destroy, the centralized structure of imperial government. At the same time, they also saw the emergence of new forms of military service and military organization. The most important of these changes were the creation of a dependent, hereditary military caste that was clearly distinguished from the general population, an increasing reliance on cavalry forces of non-Chinese, “barbarian” origin, and the development of command structures that left tremendous authority in the hands of local and regional military leaders. All of these developments amounted to the negation of the early Western Han military system that had been based on universal service and temporary, ad hoc command arrangements.

— David Graff

== Chariots and horses ==
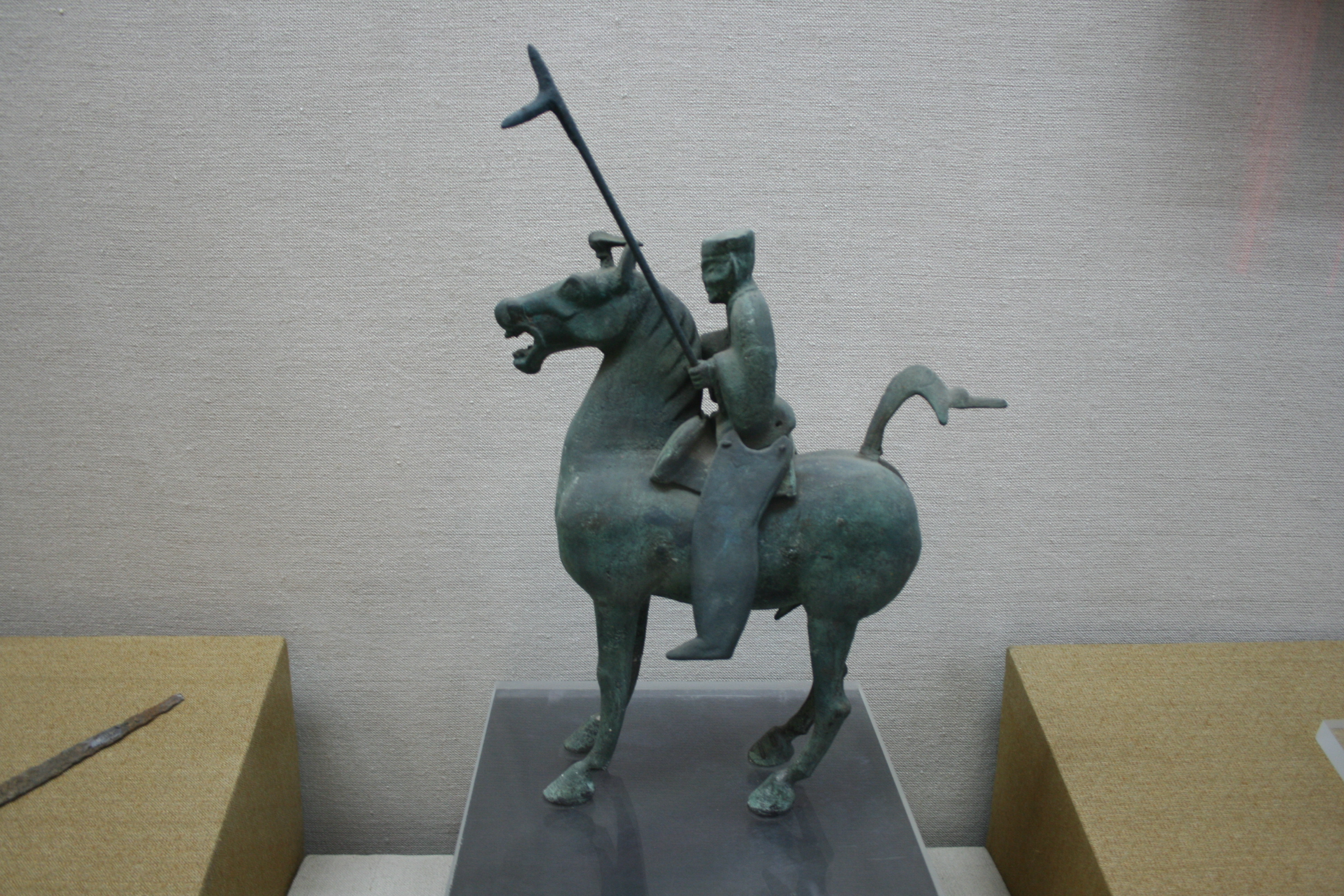
Han bronze cavalry figurine

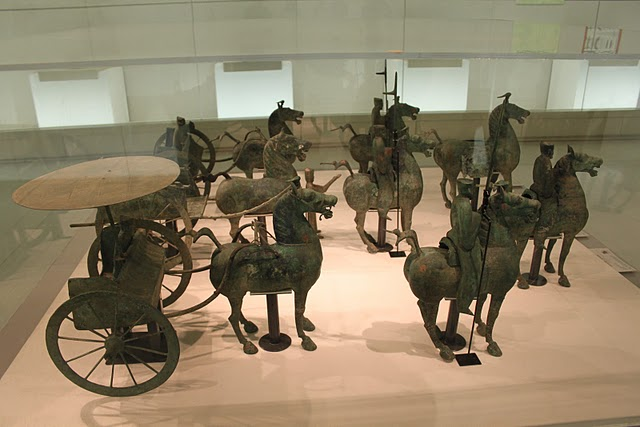
Han cavalry and chariots

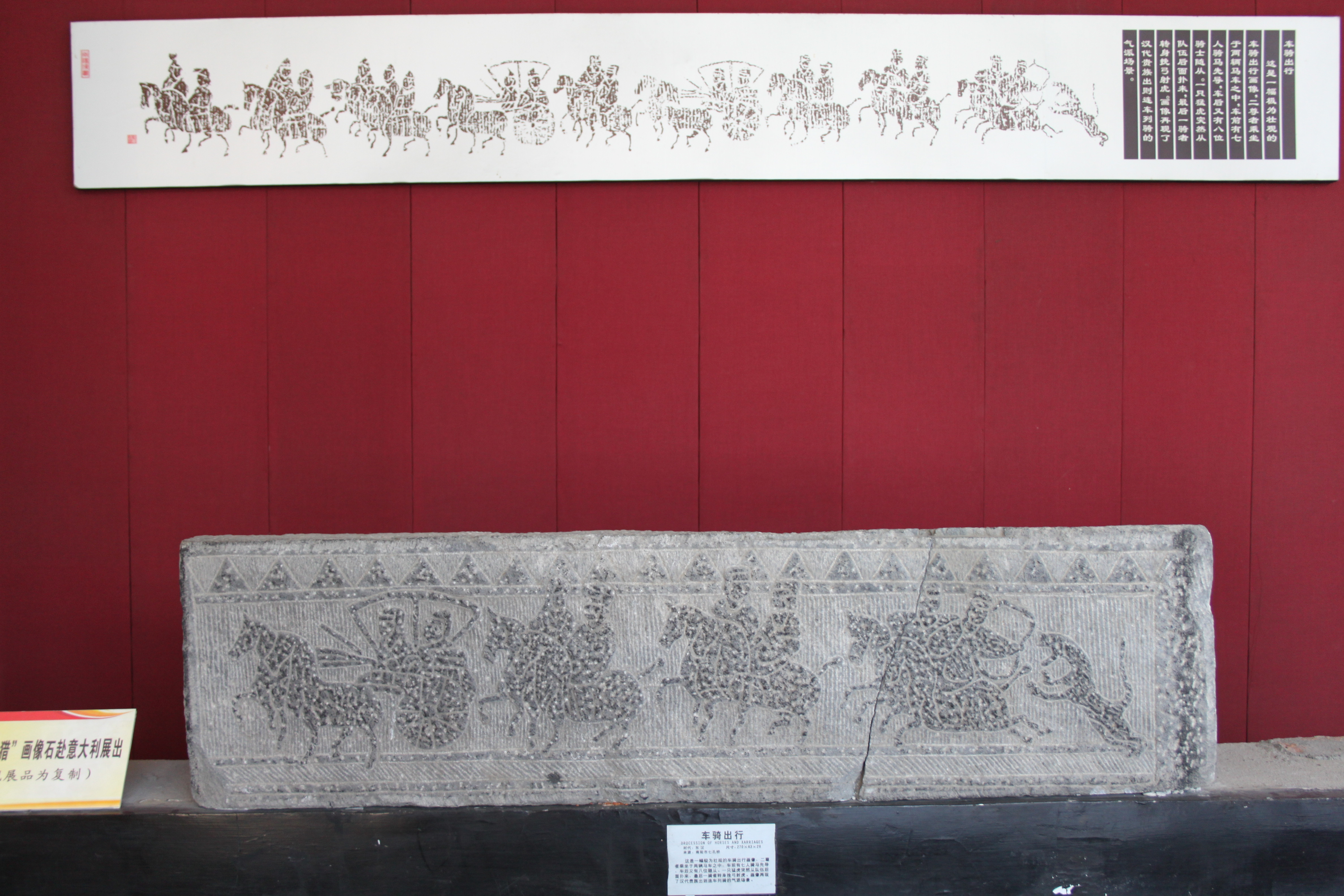
Han tomb brick depicting chariots and horsemen

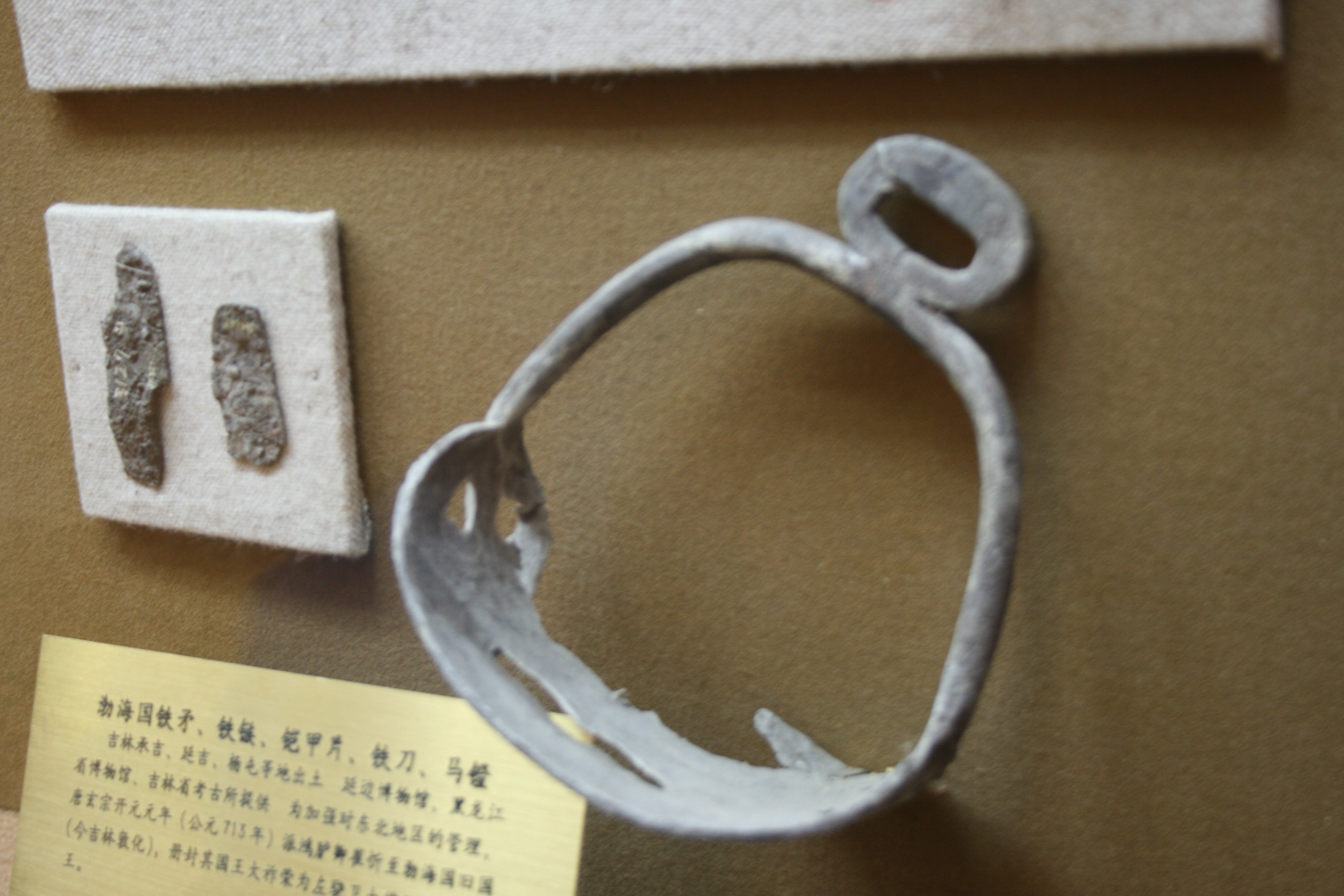
Han mounting stirrup

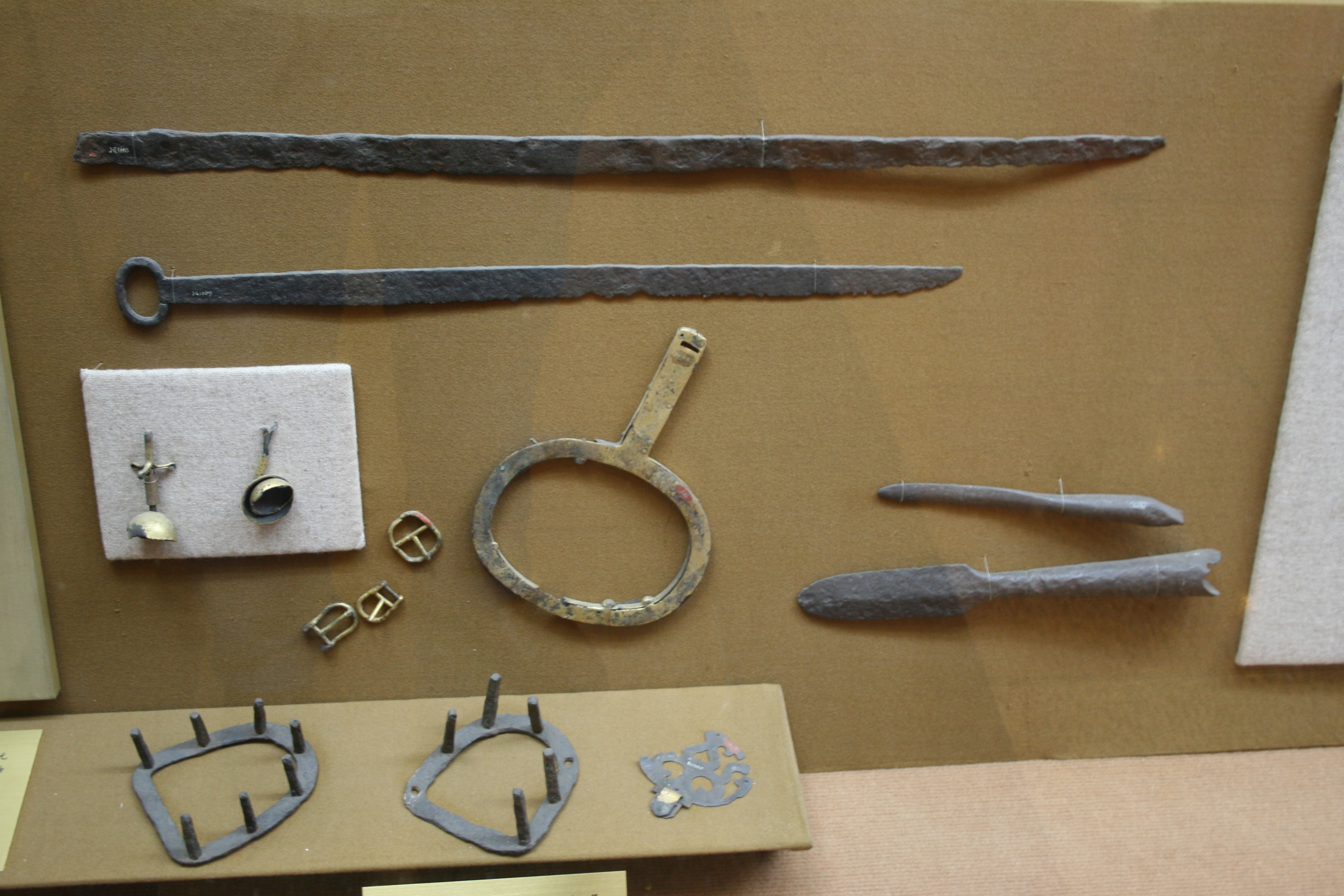
Han cavalry equipment

Although the chariot started losing prominence around the late Warring States period, it remained in use into the Han era until the Xiongnu war of 133 BC when they proved too slow to catch up to an all cavalry force. However chariots were still used as defensive pieces several decades later.

The Han's cavalry forces were fairly limited at the beginning of the dynasty. Their only large scale horse breeding programs existed in cities along northwest China: Tianshui, Longxi, Anding, Beidi, Shang, and Xihe. Emperor Wen of Han (r. 180–157 BC) decreed that three men of age could be exempted from military service for each horse sent by the family to the government. Emperor Jing of Han (r. 157–141 BC) set up 36 government pastures in the northwest to breed horses for military use and sent 30,000 slaves to care for them. By the time Emperor Wu of Han (r. 9 March 141 BC – 29 March 87 BC) came to power, the Han government had control over herds of roughly 300,000 horses, which increased to over 450,000 under Emperor Wu's reign. On paper, the Han dynasty at its height was capable of fielding up to 300,000 horsemen, but was probably constrained by their immense upkeep. A cavalryman on average cost 87,000 cash, not including rations, while a regular soldier only 10,000 cash. The total expenditure of a 300,000 strong cavalry force would therefore have been around 2.18 times the entire government's annual revenue.

Single mounting stirrups were used, but full double stirrups didn't appear until the later Jin dynasty (266–420).

== Armour ==
Han armour was similar to the armour used by the Qin dynasty with some variations and improvements. Soldiers wore suits of lacquered rawhide, hardened leather, bronze, iron, or steel, and came in varieties such as scale and lamellar. Helmets came as rawhide or hardened leather caps that were sometimes supplemented by a layer of metal lamellar, or made of metals such as iron or steel. Some riders wore armour and carried shields and some horses were at least partially armored, but substantial cataphract-like armor with comprehensive armor covering the entire horse is not attested to in writing until the late 2nd century.

Han dynasty inventory list (13 BC)
Item	Inventory	Imperial Heirloom
Jia armour	142,701	34,265
Kai armour	63,324	
Thigh armour	10,563	
Iron thigh armour	256	
Iron lamellar armour (sets/suits?)	587,299	
Helmets	98,226	
Horse armour	5,330	
Shields	102,551	

During the late 2nd century BC, the government created a monopoly on the ironworks, which may have caused a decrease in the quantity and quality of iron and armour. Bu Shi claimed that the resulting products were inferior because they were made to meet quotas rather than for practical use. These monopolies as debated in the Discourses on Salt and Iron were abolished by the beginning of the 1st century AD. By the late Eastern Han Dynasty, political corruption caused a decline in the discipline and efficiency of the administration, which in turn had a detrimental effect on the quality of weapons. During the decline of the Eastern Han Dynasty in 150 AD, Cui Shi made similar complaints about the issue of quality control in government production due to corruption: "...not long thereafter the overseers stopped being attentive, and the wrong men have been promoted by Imperial decree. Greedy officers fight over the materials, and shifty craftsmen cheat them... Iron [i.e. steel] is quenched in vinegar, making it brittle and easy to... [?] The suits of armour are too small and do not fit properly."

Composite bows were considered effective against unarmoured enemies at 165 yards, and against armoured opponents at 65 yards.

References to "great shields" mention they were used on the front line to protect spearmen and crossbowmen. Shields were also commonly paired with the single edged dao and used among cavalrymen.

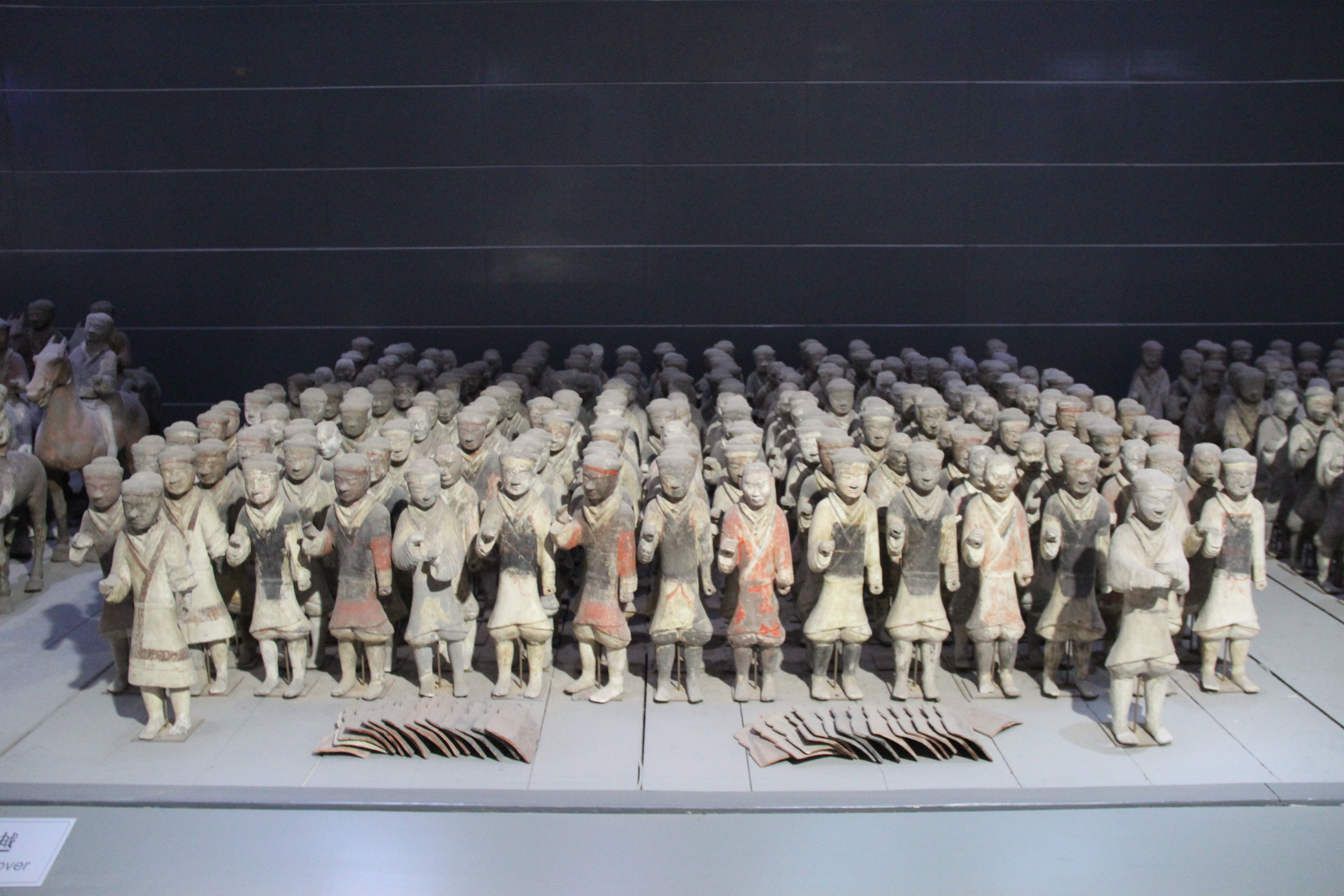
Han tomb figurines of soldiers and their shields

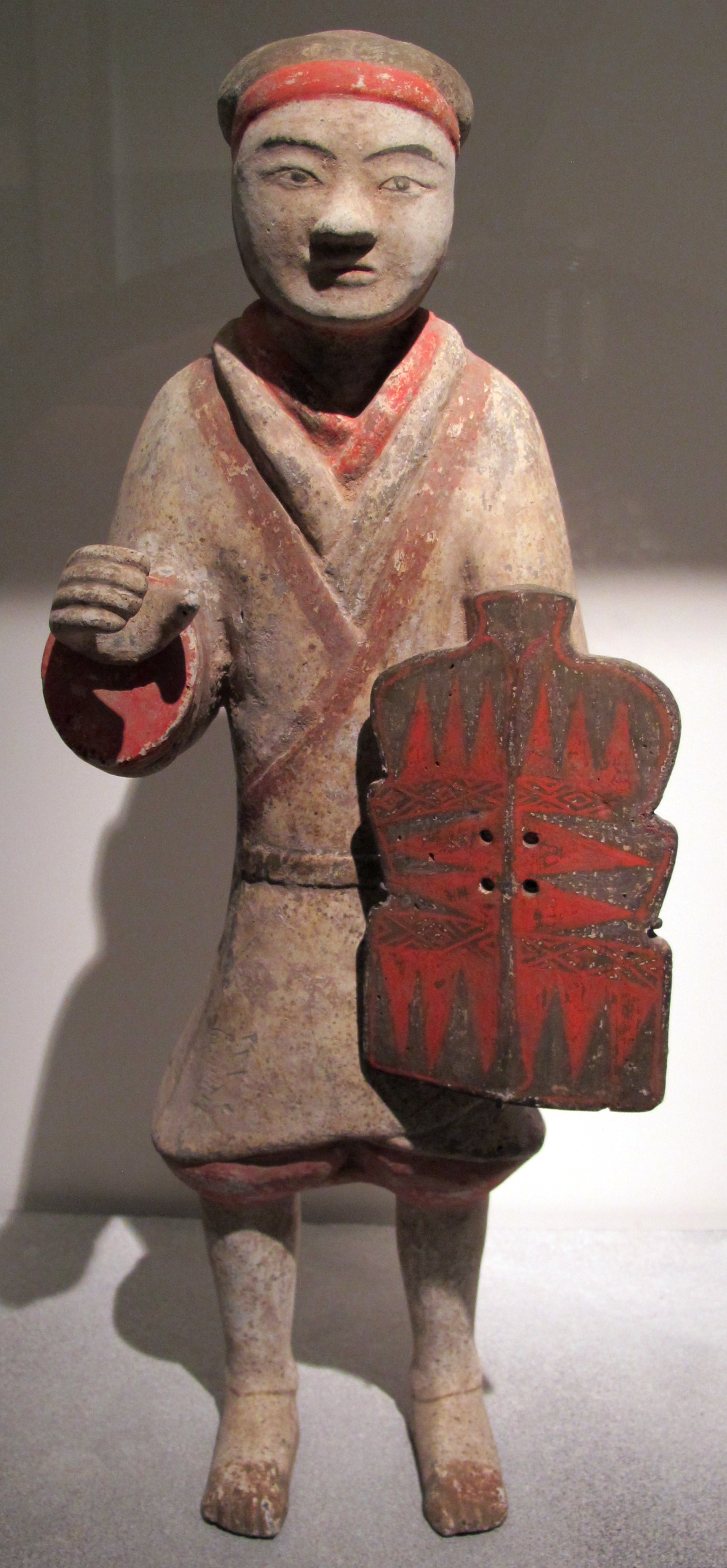

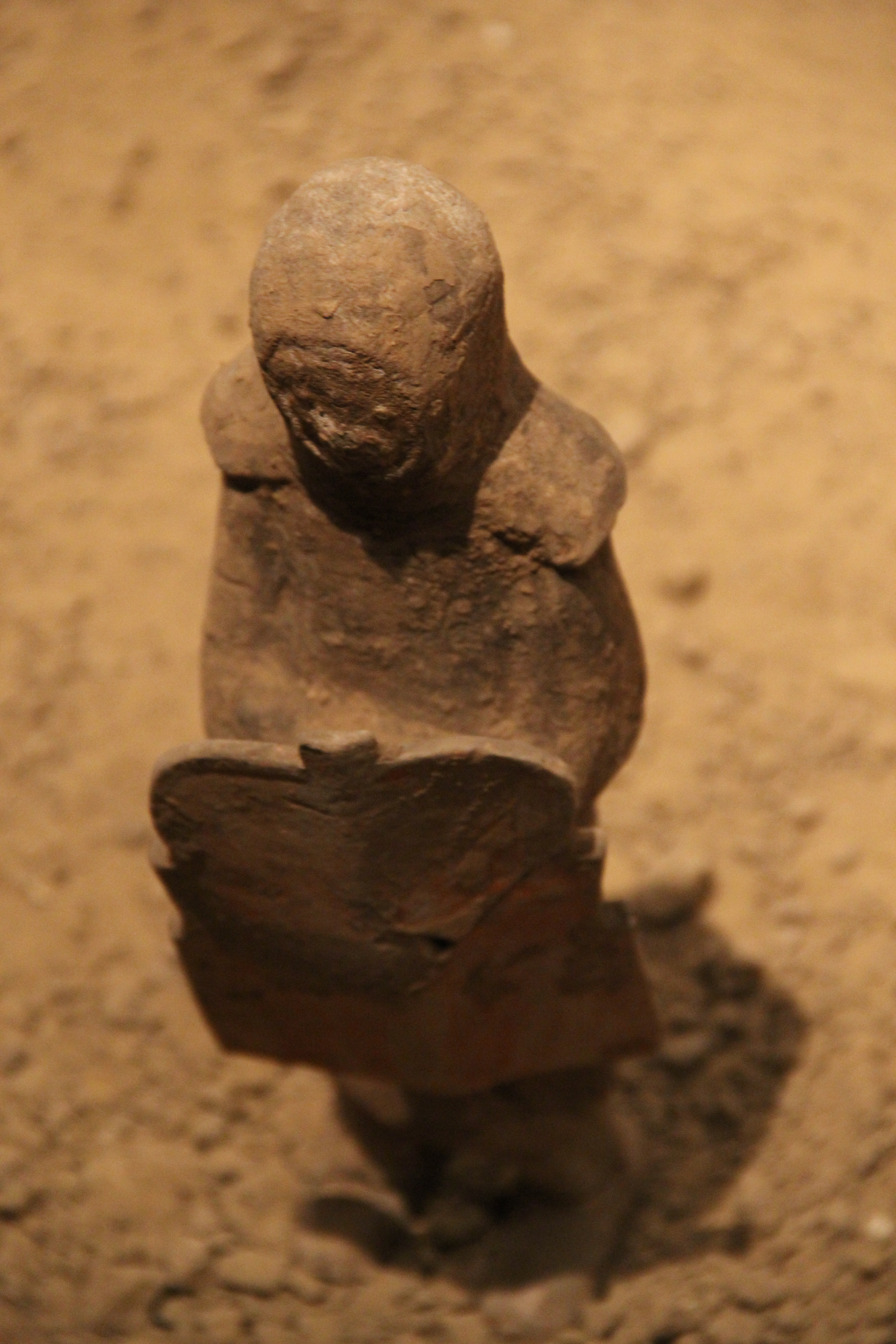
Han shieldbearer

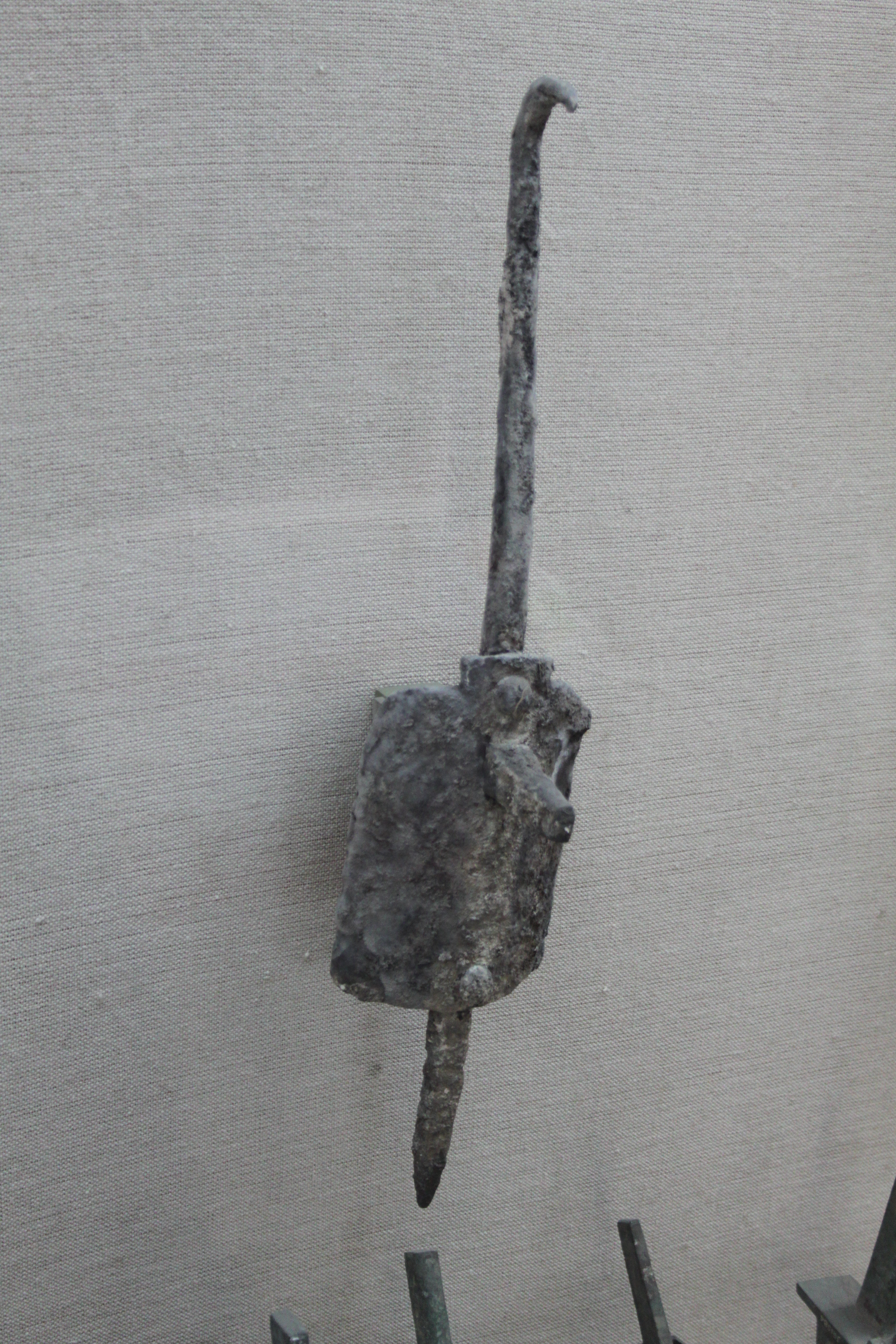
Han hook shield

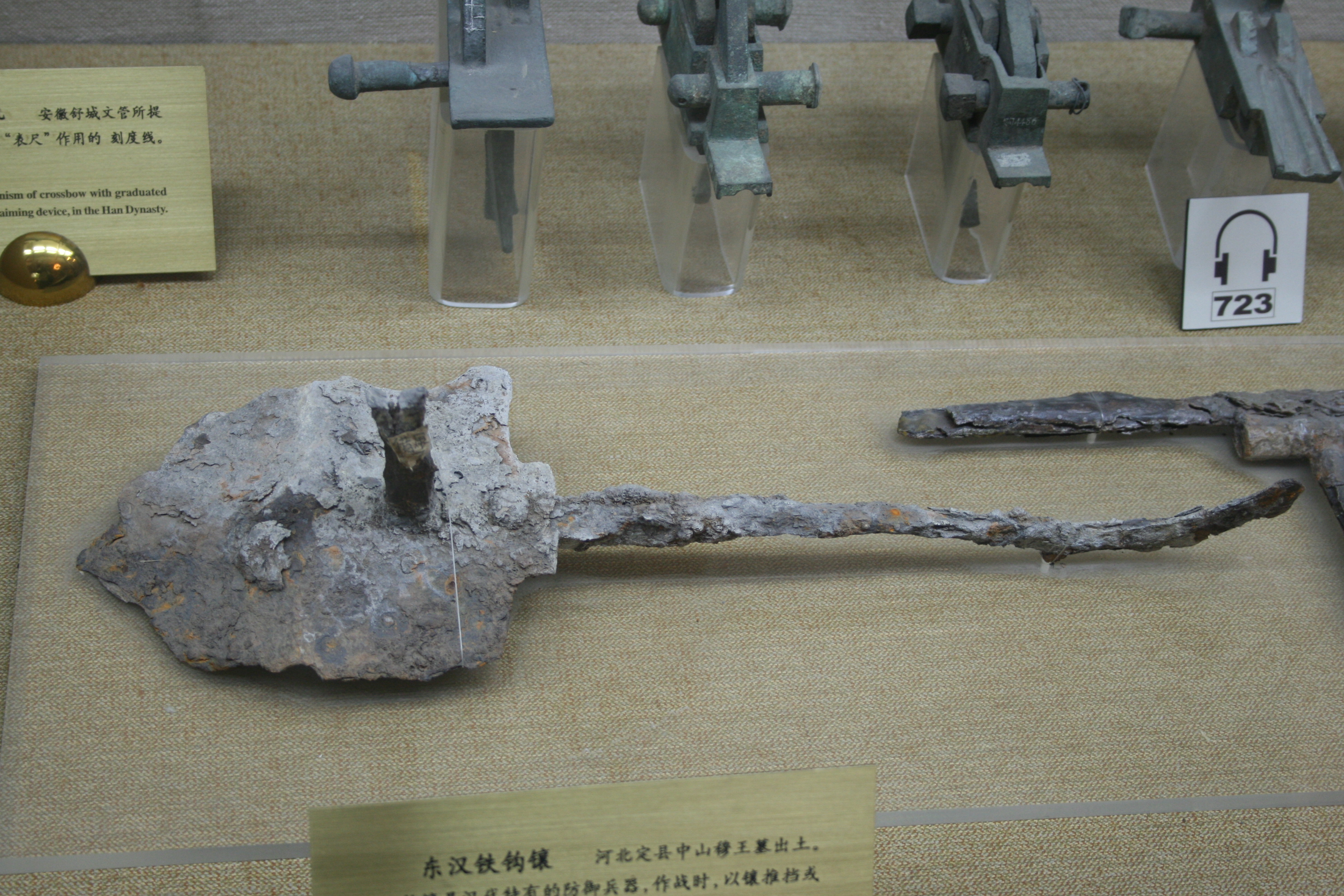
Han iron hook shield

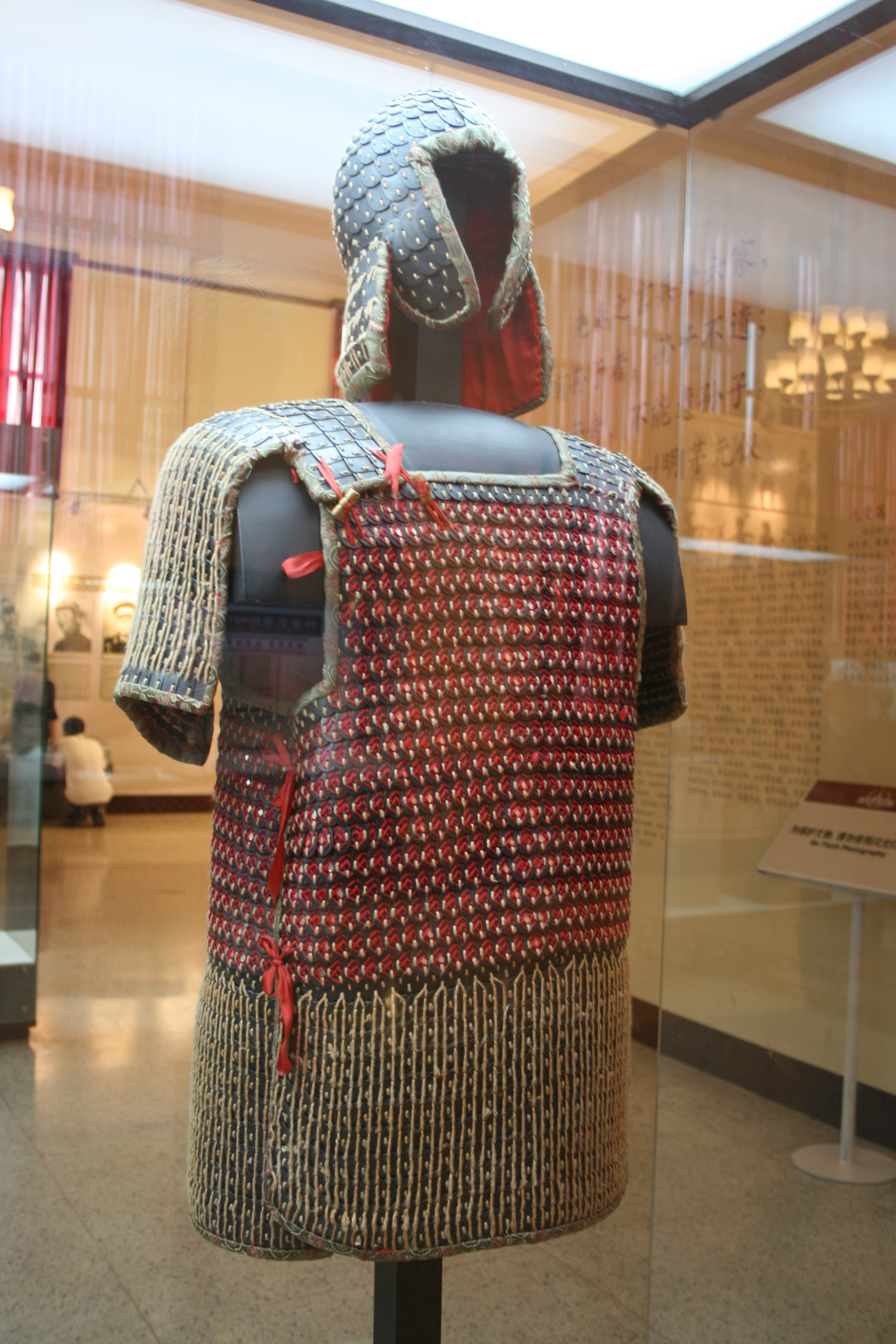
Replica of Han iron scale armor with helmet.

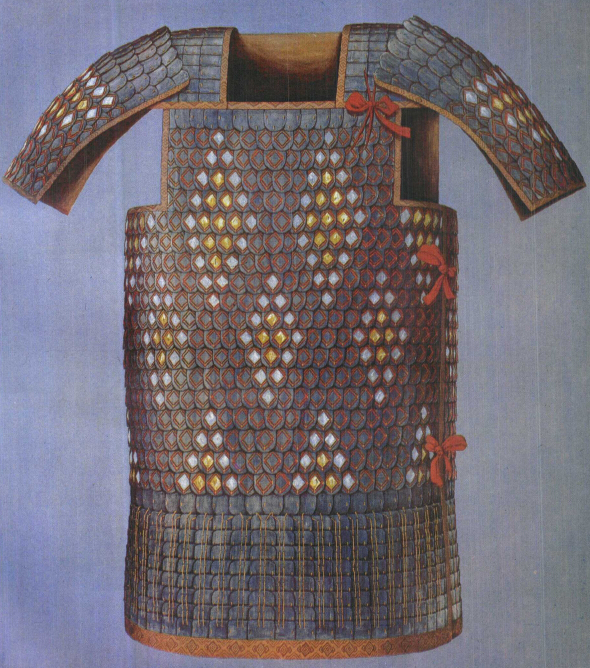
Han armor decorated with gold and silver inlays from Prince of Qi's Tomb, Shandong.

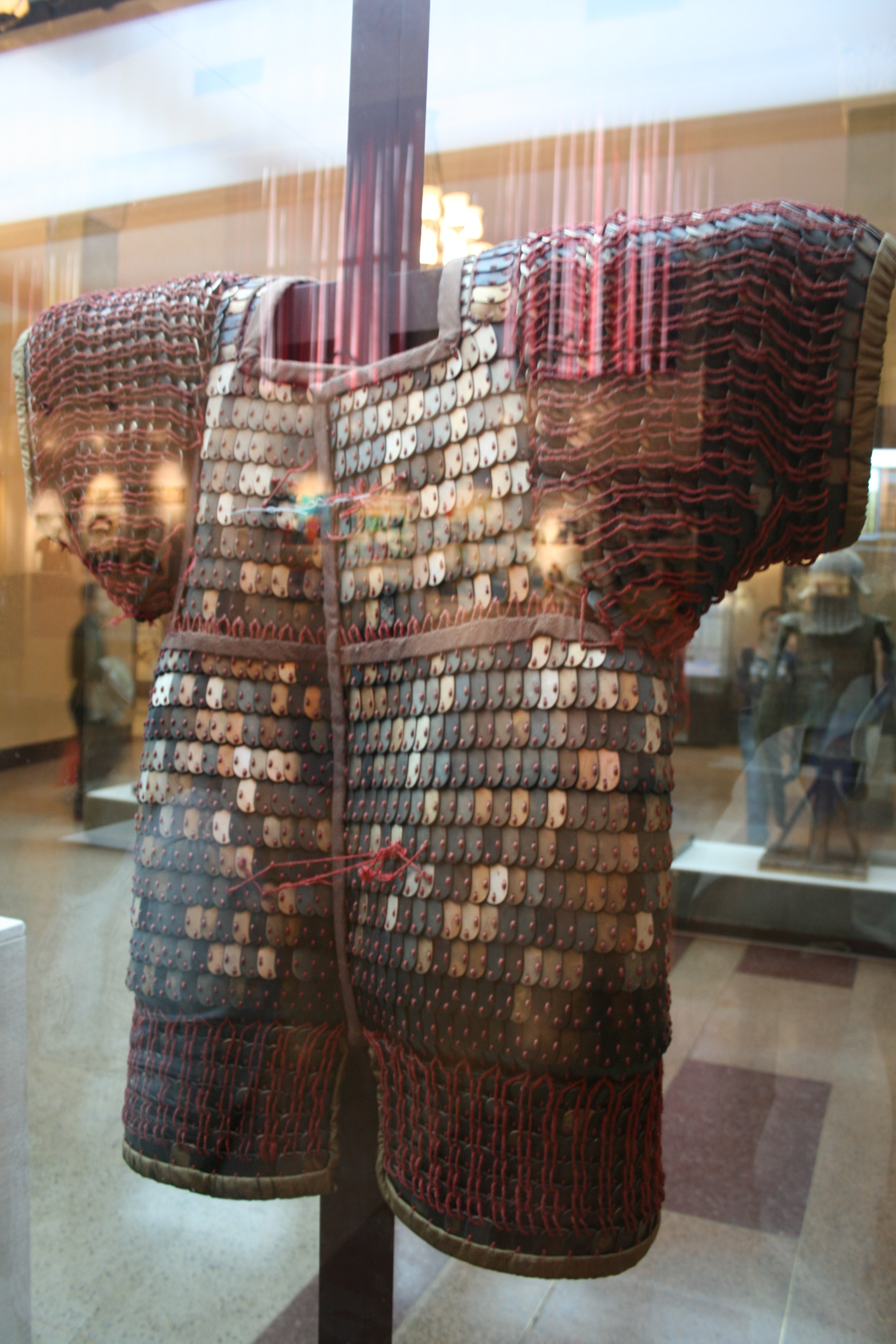
Replica of Western Han "sleeved armor" (lit. tǒngxiùkǎi", 筒袖铠)

== Swords and polearms ==
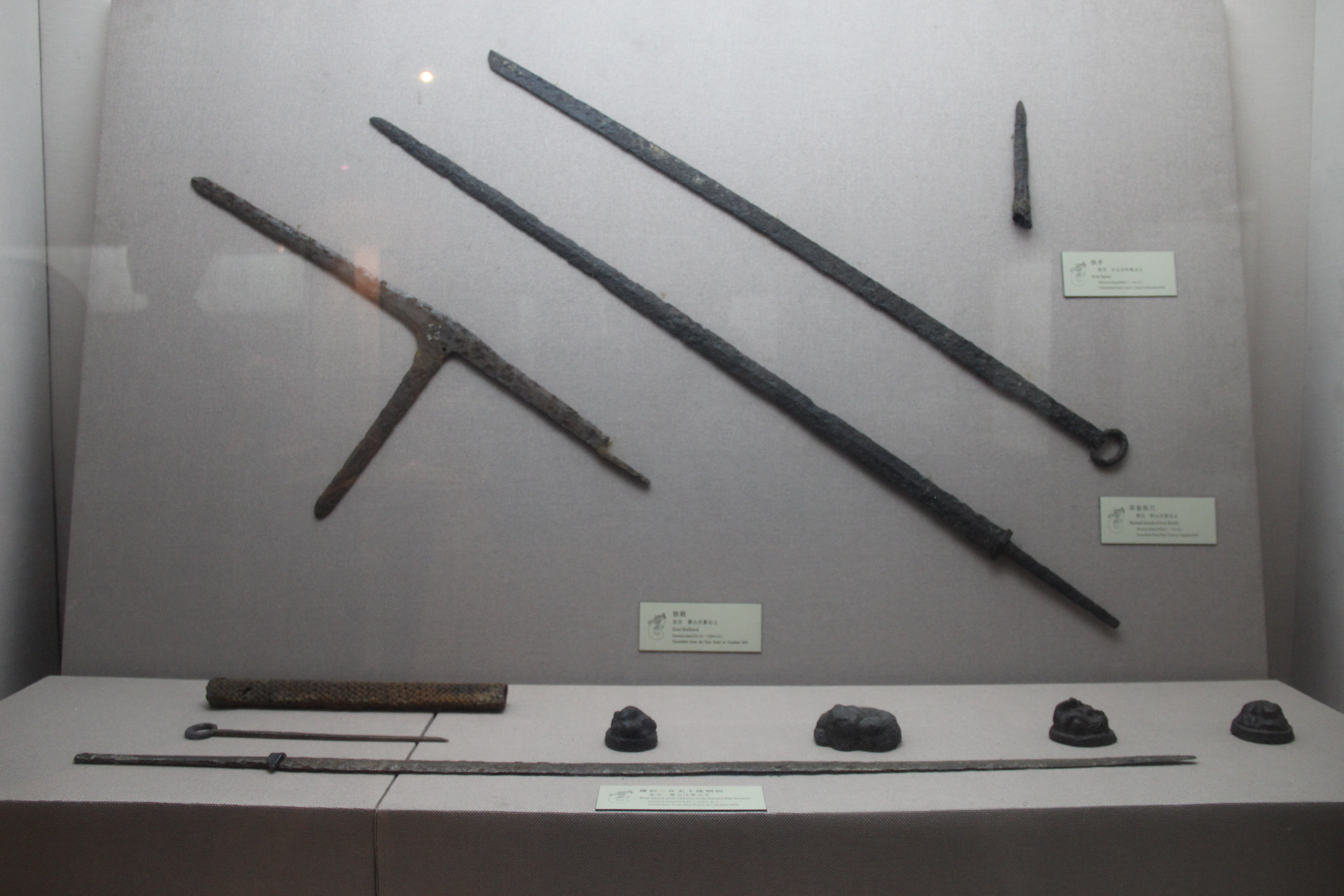
Han dao, jian, and halberd

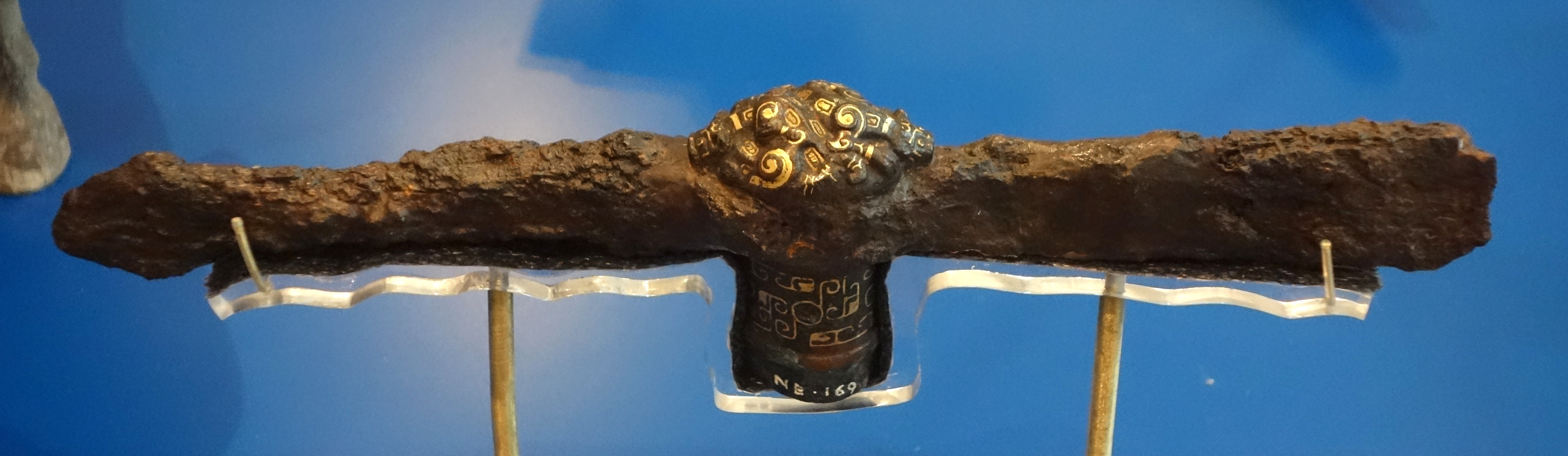
Han iron axe with bronze and gold inlay

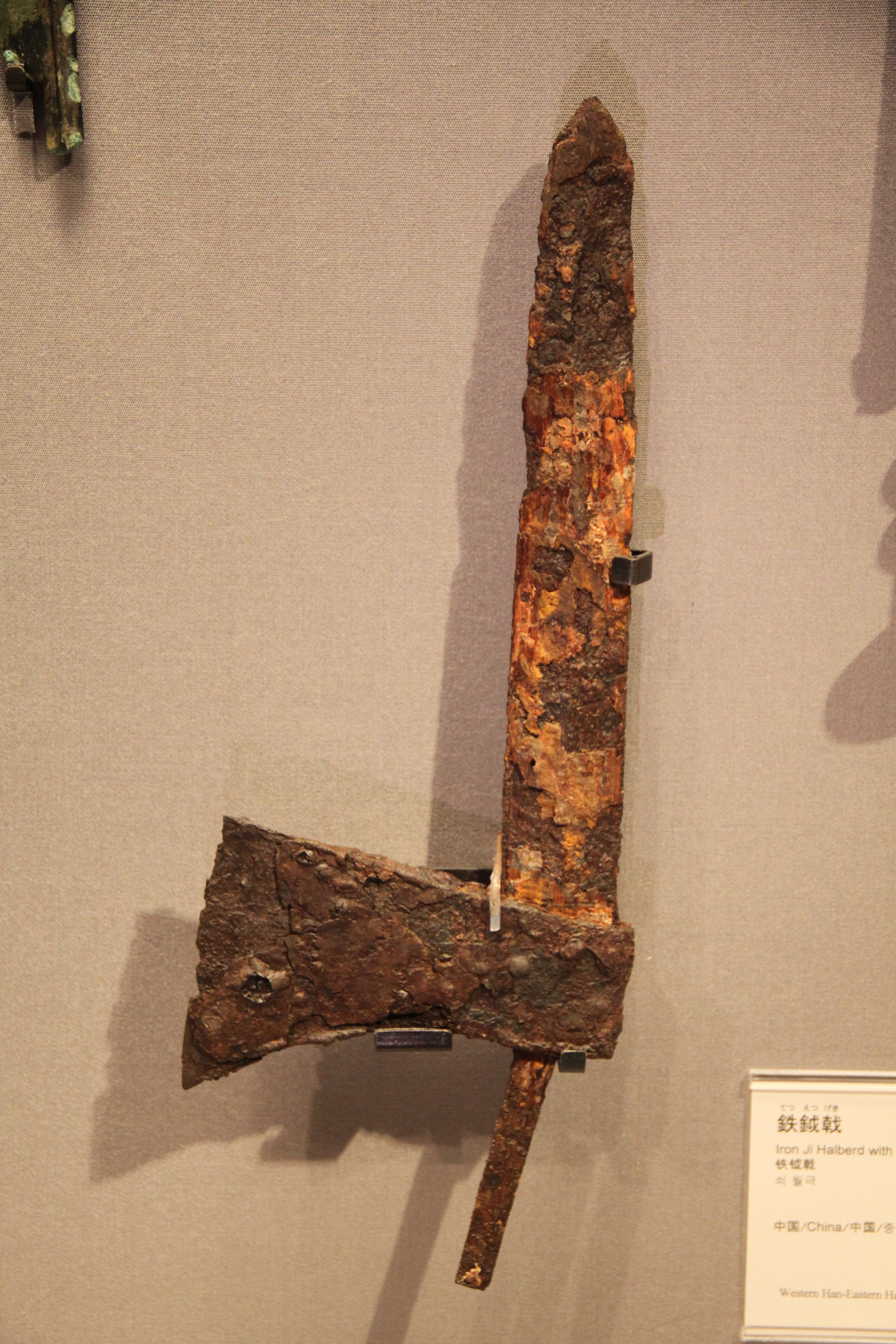
Han iron axe halberd

The jian was mentioned as one of the "Five Weapons" during the Han dynasty, the other four being dao, spear, halberd, and staff. Another version of the Five Weapons lists the bow and crossbow as one weapon, the jian and dao as one weapon, in addition to halberd, shield, and armour.

The jian was a popular weapon during the Han era and there emerged a class of swordsmen who made their living through fencing. Sword fencing was also a popular pastime for aristocrats. A 37 chapter manual known as the Way of the Jian is known to have existed, but is no longer extant. South and central China were said to have produced the best swordsmen.

There existed a weapon called the "Horse Beheading Jian", so called because it was supposedly able to cut off a horse's head. However, another source says that it was an execution tool used on special occasions rather than a military weapon.

Daos with ring pommels also became widespread as a cavalry weapon during the Han era. The dao had the advantage of being single edged, which meant the dull side could be thickened to strengthen the sword, making it less prone to breaking. When paired with a shield, the dao made for a practical replacement for the jian, hence it became the more popular choice as time went on. After the Han, sword dances using the dao rather than the jian are mentioned to have occurred. Archaeological samples range from 86 to 114 cm in length.

Han dynasty inventory list (13 BC)
Item	Inventory	Imperial Heirloom
Bronze dagger-axe	632	563
Spear	52,555	2,377
Long lance (pi)	451,222	1,421
Ranseur-like Swordstaff (sha)	24,167	
Halberd (ji)	6,634	
Youfang (Some type of halberd/polearm, its exact description is unclear)	78,393	
Jian	99,905	4
Dao	156,135	
Sawing dao	30,098	
Great dao	127	232
Iron axe	1,132	136
Dagger	24,804	
Shield	102,551	
Crossbow	537,707	11,181
Bow	77,52	
Bolts	11,458,424	34,265
Arrows	1,199,316	511

An account of Duan Jiong's tactical formation in 167 AD specifies that he arranged "…three ranks of halberds (長鏃 changzu), swordsmen (利刃 liren) and spearmen (長矛 changmao), supported by crossbows (強弩 qiangnu), with light cavalry (輕騎 jingji) on each wing."

The characters zu and mao both indicate lances or spears, but I suspect the changzu may have had two blades or points. Such weapons, commonly identified as 戟 ji, but also as 鈹 pi and 錟 tan, have been known from early times. Some bronze horsemen found in the tomb at Leitai 雷台 by present-day Wuwei are armed with halberds. An alternative rendering for changzu would be “javelin,” but javelins were not common in ancient China.

— Rafe de Crespigny

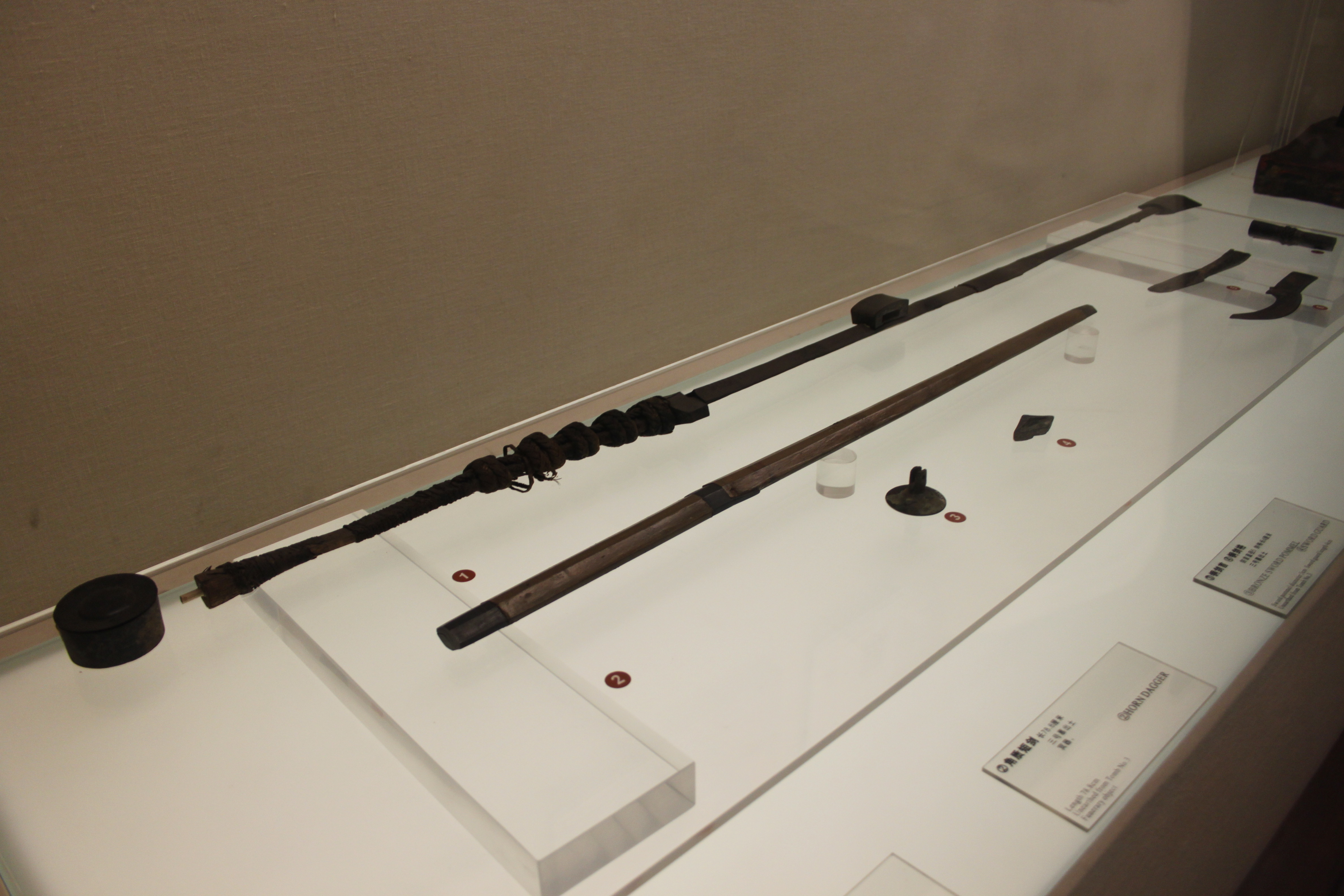
Sword (jian) from Mawangdui

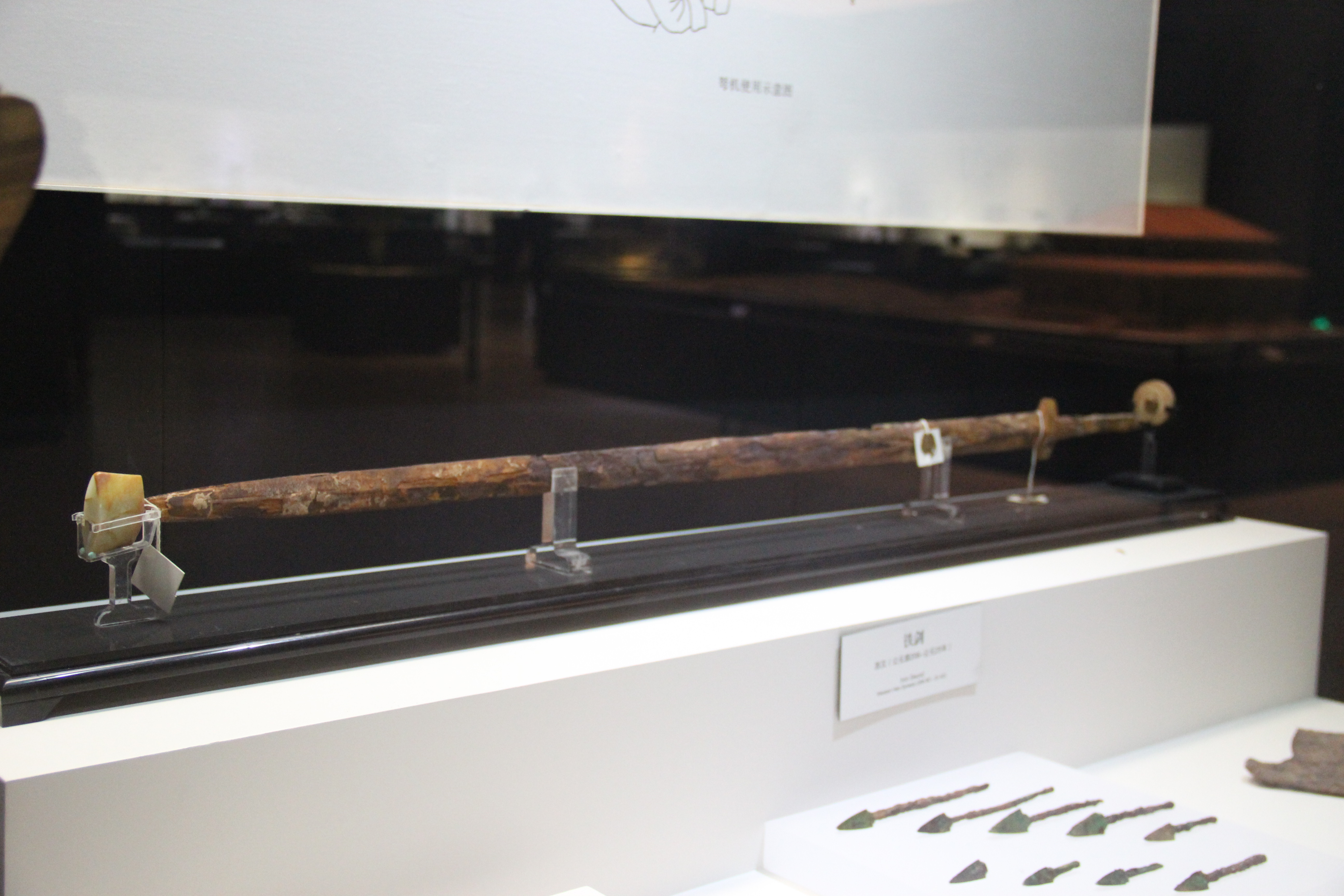
Jian, Western Han

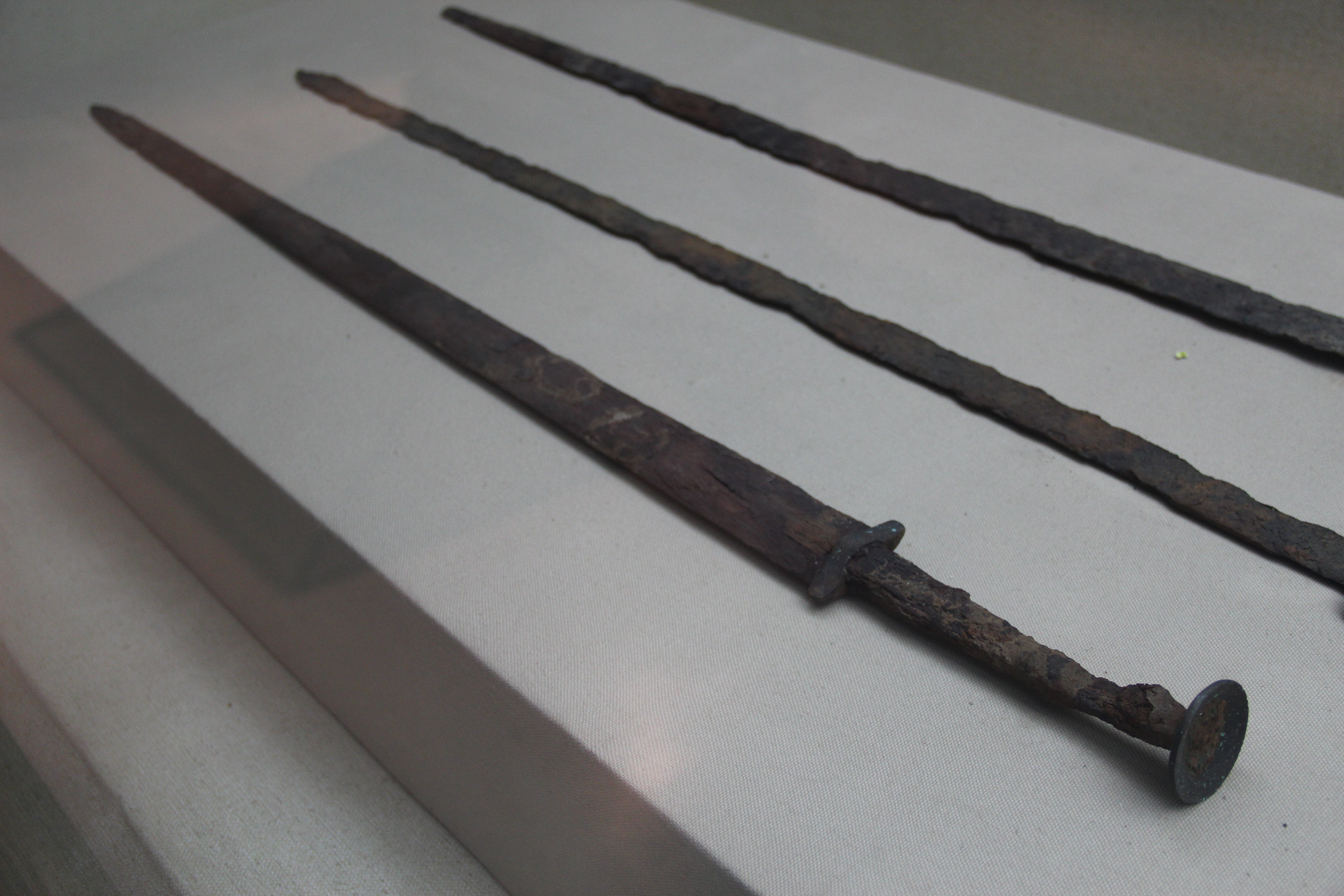
Iron swords, Han dynasty

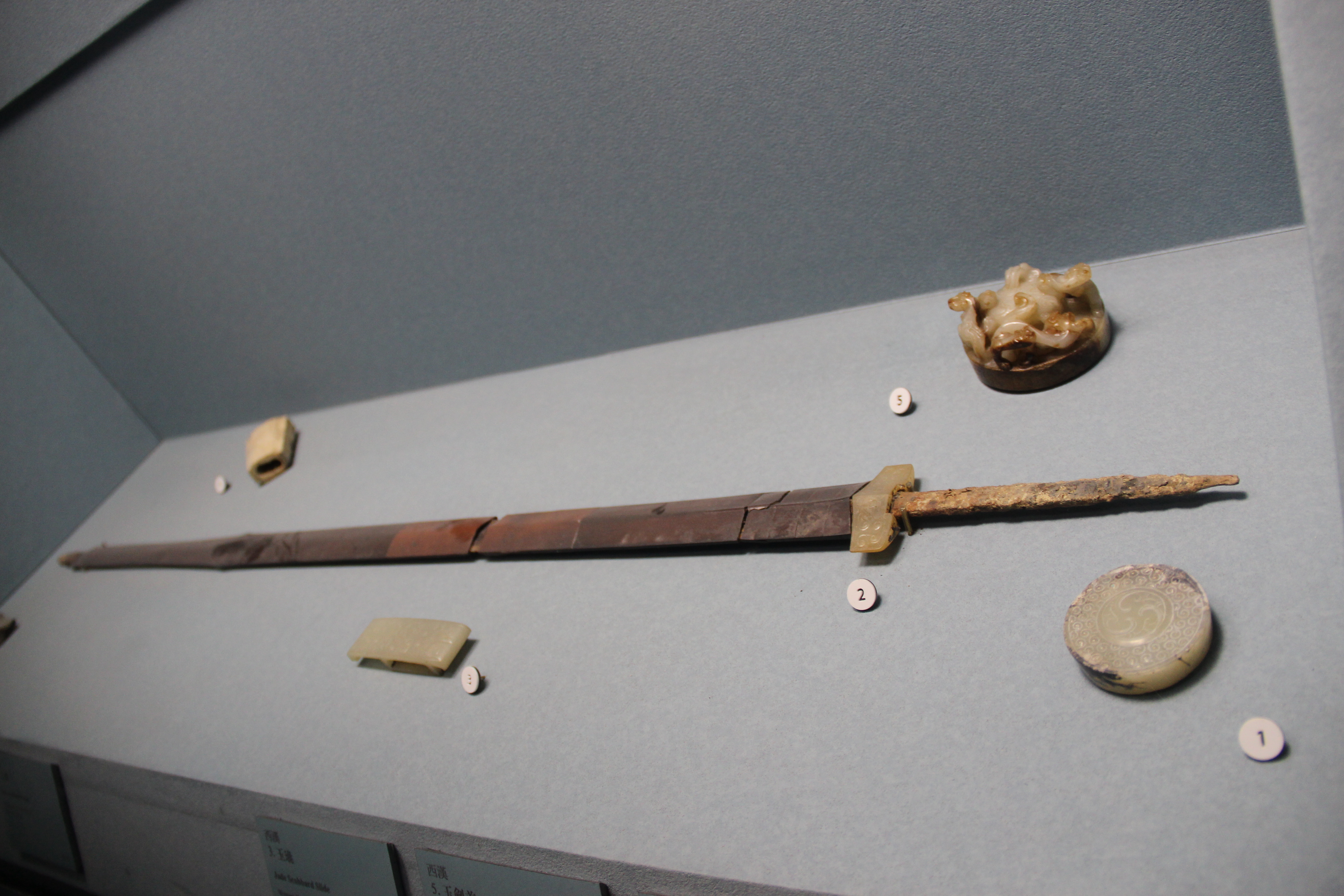
Sword with jade guard, Han dynasty

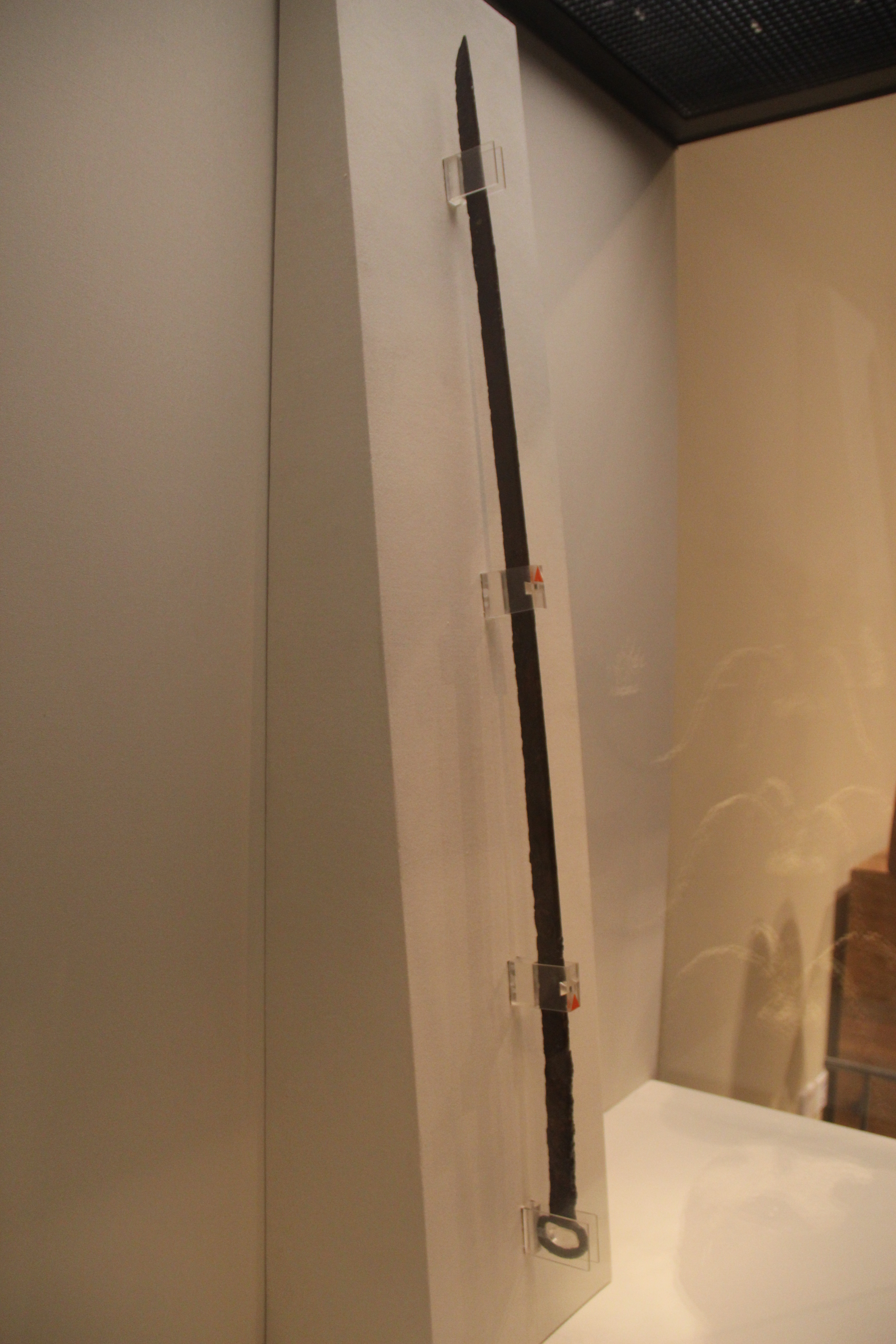
Steel sabre with ring pommel, Han dynasty

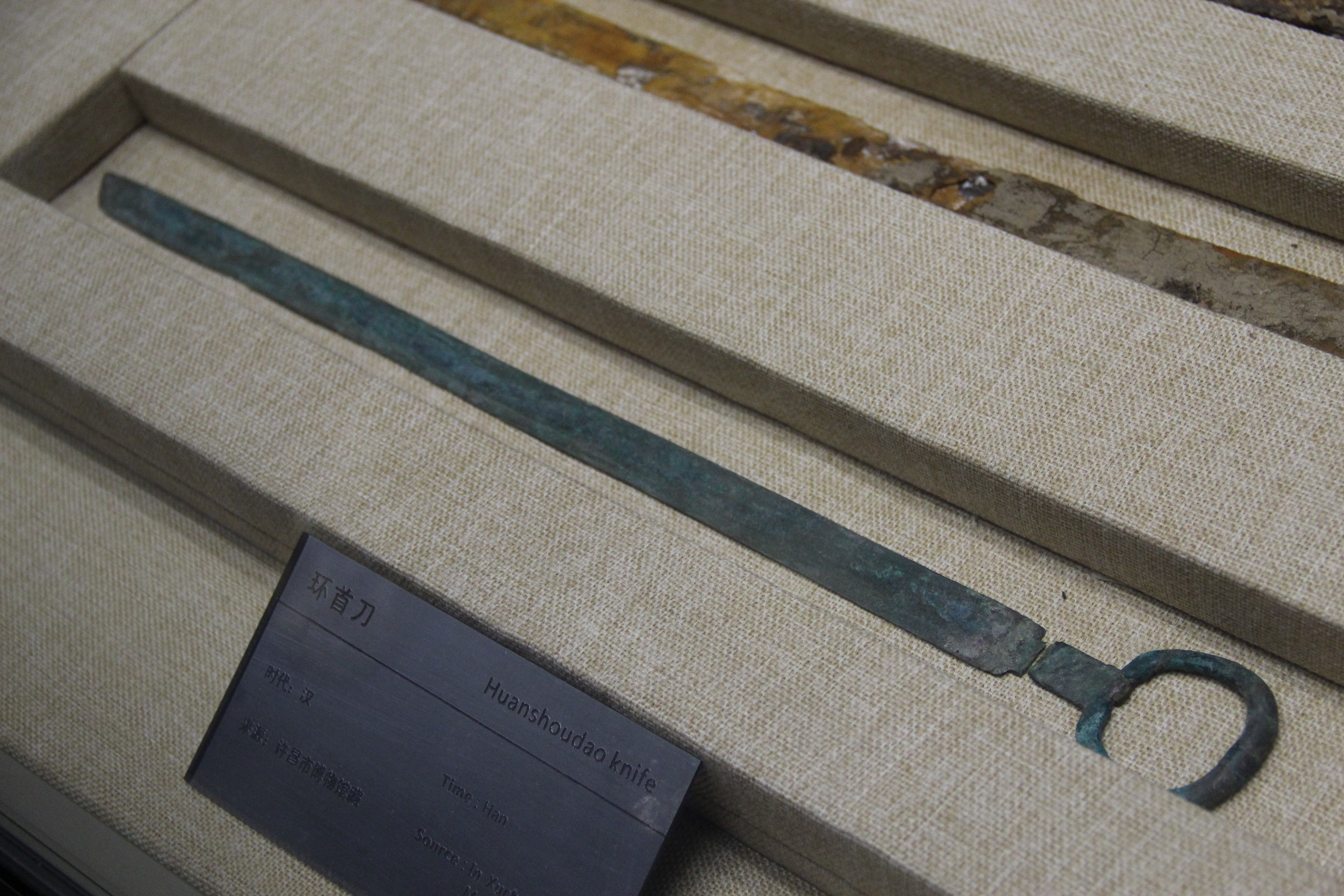
Han ring-pommel backsword (環首刀)

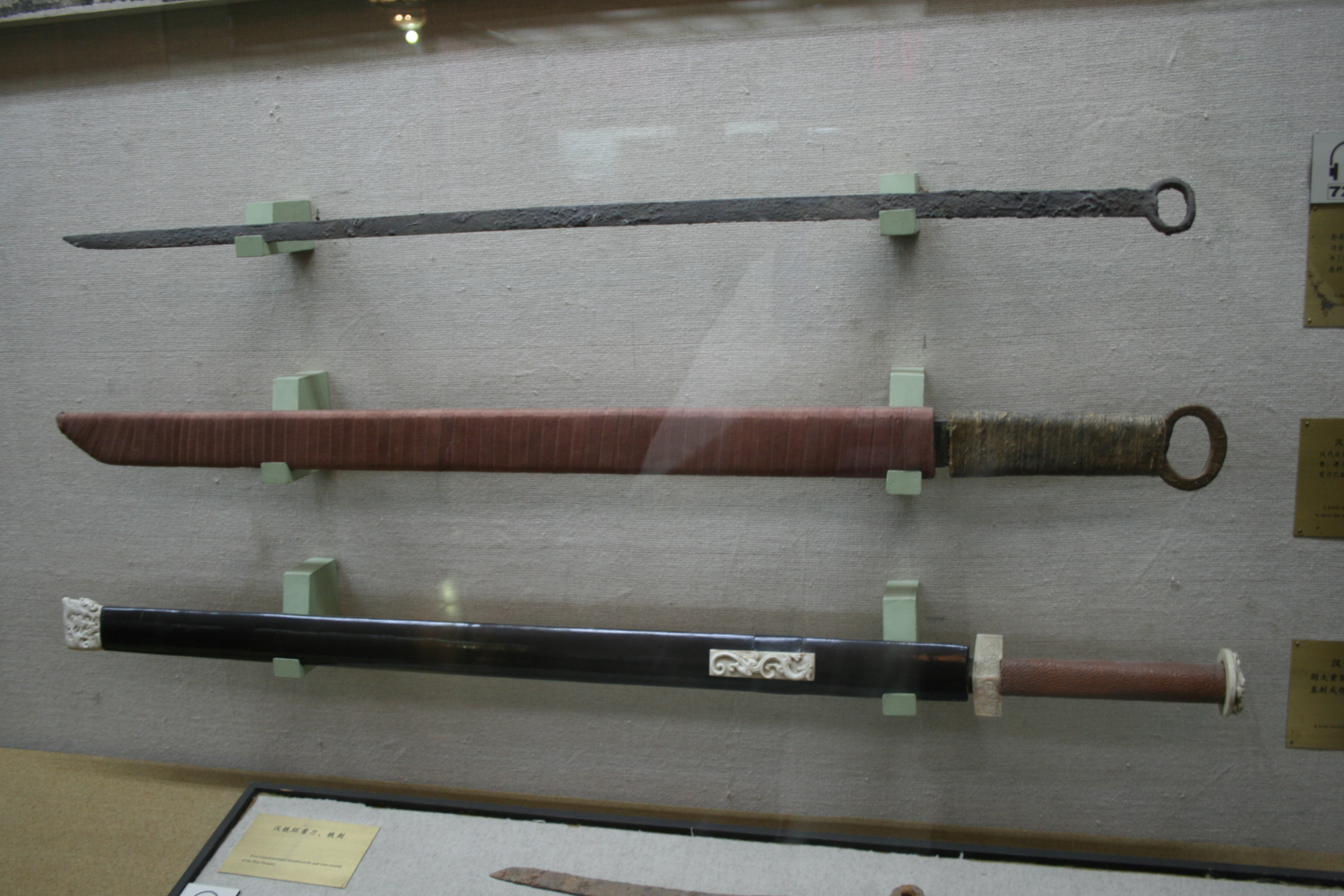
Restored replica of Han ring-pommel backsword (環首刀) and Han jian.

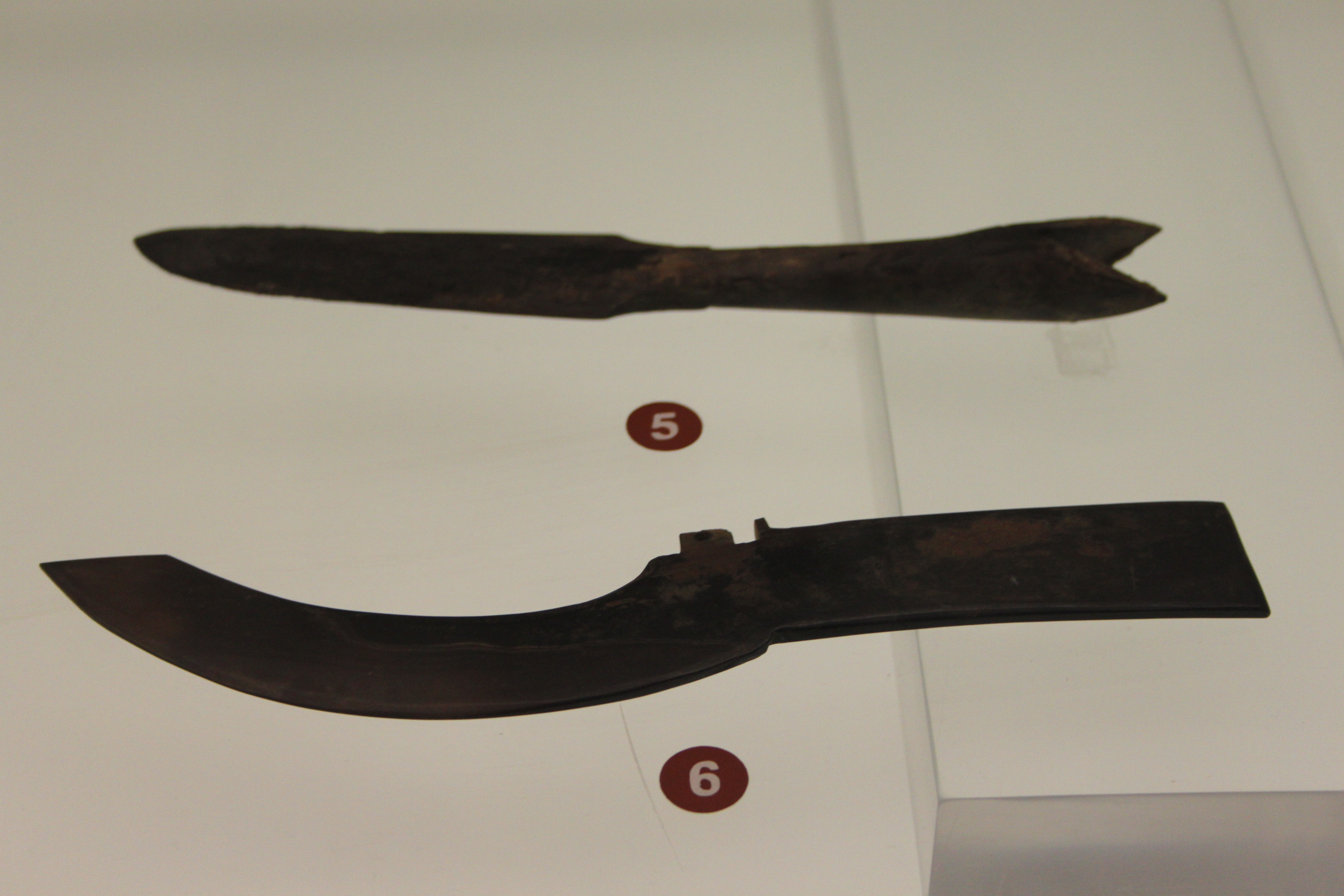
Spear and glaive polearm, Han dynasty

== Crossbow ==
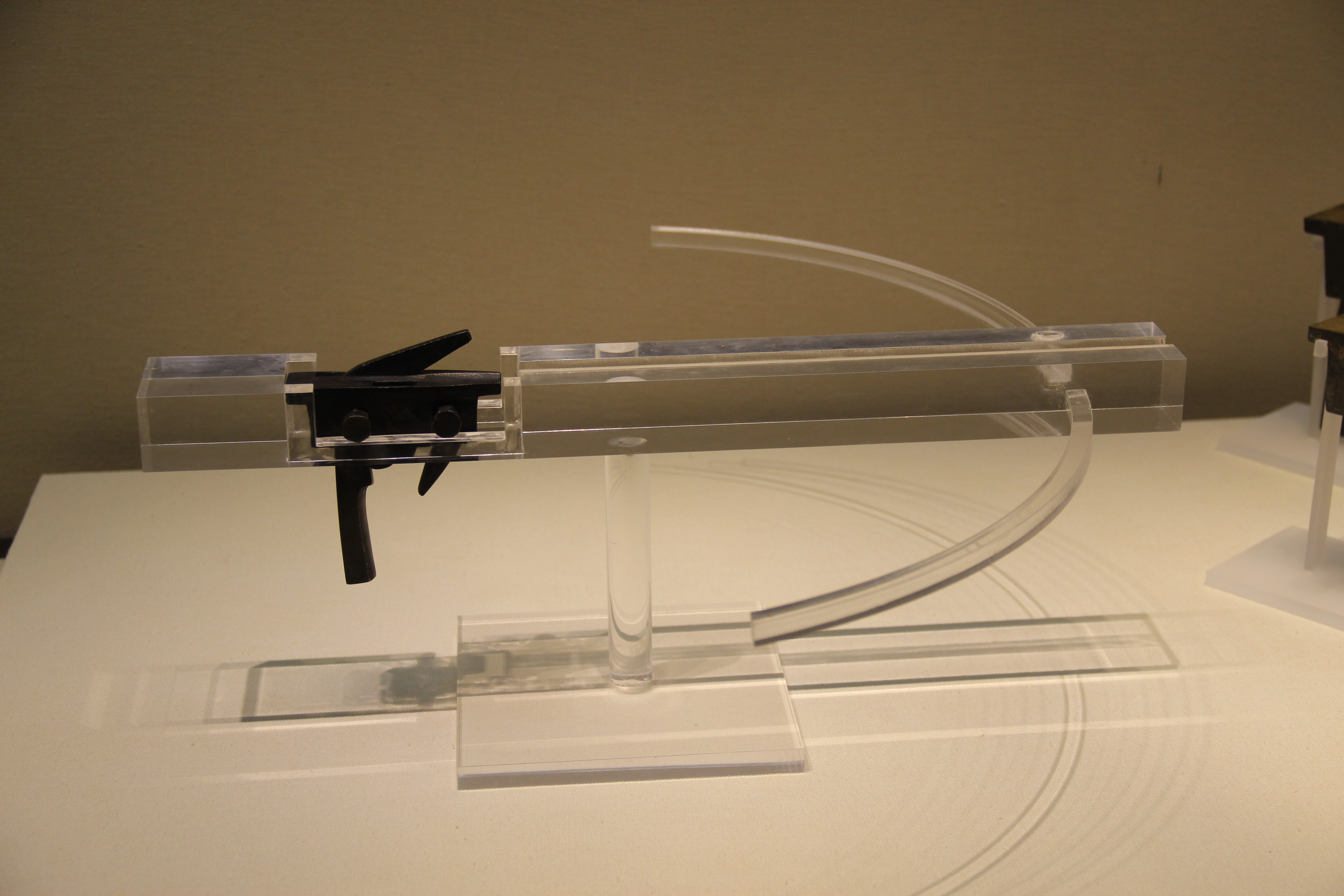
Han crossbow trigger on a crossbow frame

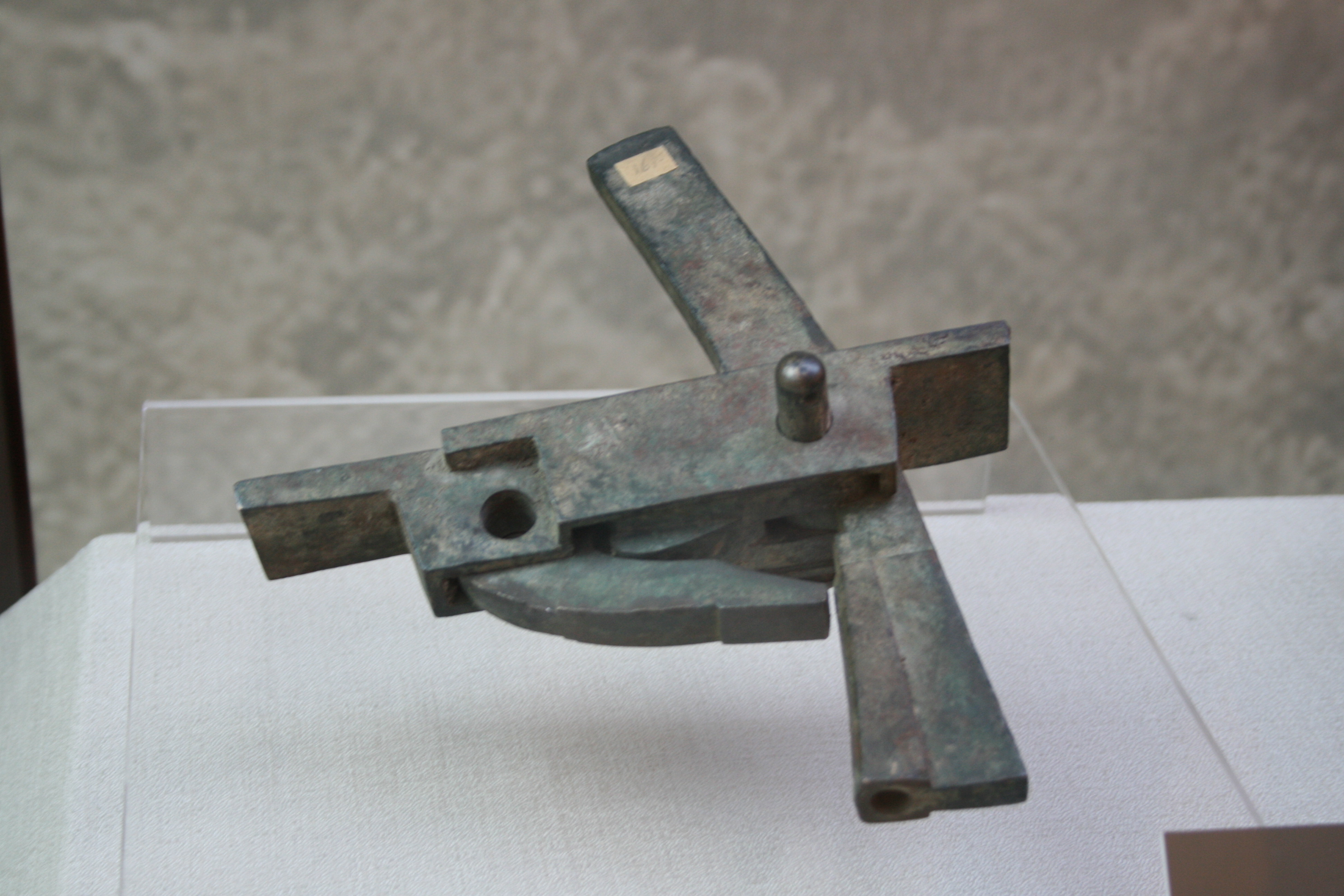
Han crossbow trigger

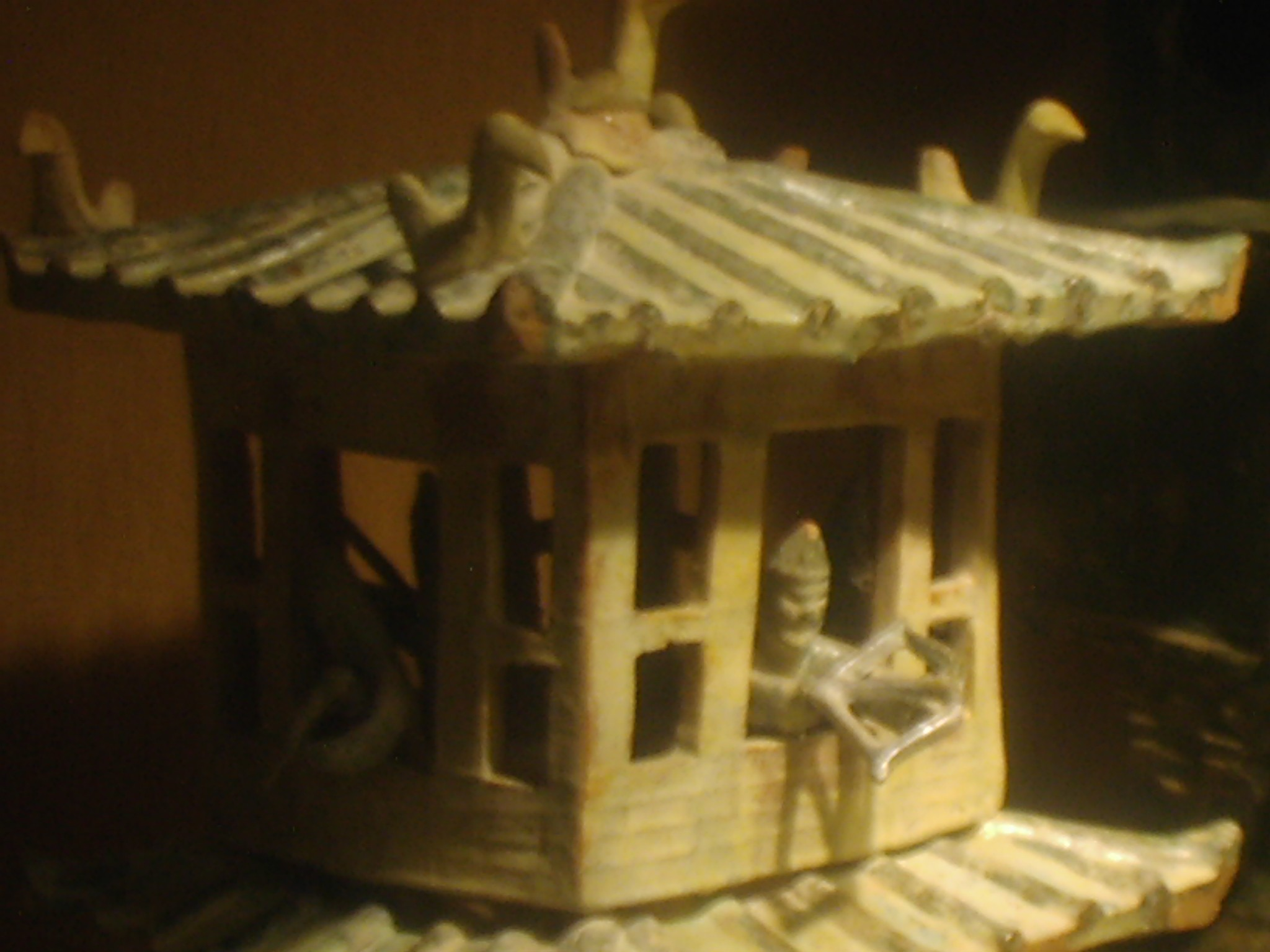
A miniature guard wielding a handheld crossbow from the top balcony of a model watchtower, made of glazed earthenware during the Eastern Han era (25–220 AD) of China, from the Metropolitan Museum of Art.

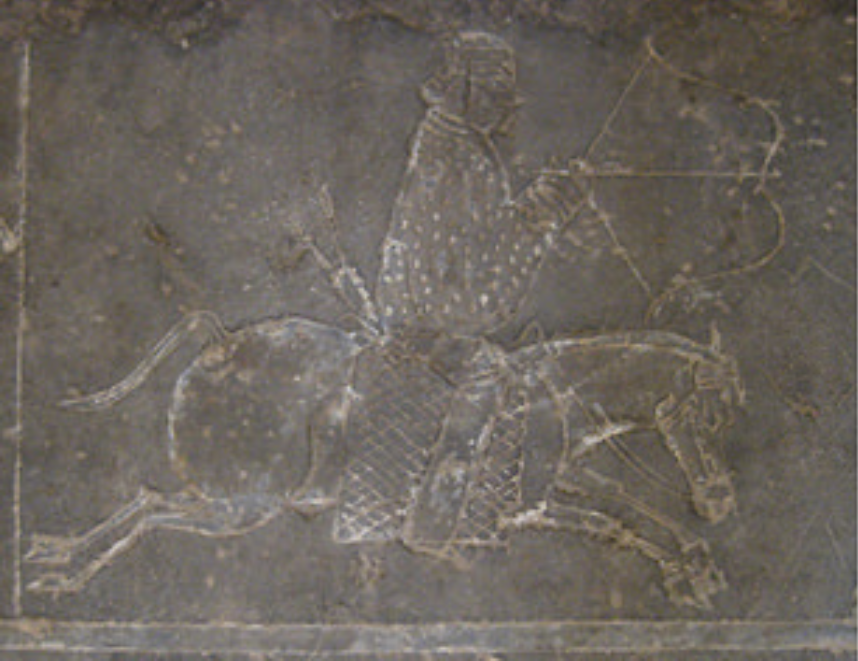
Han cavalry using a crossbow

It's clear from surviving inventory lists in Gansu and Xinjiang that the crossbow was greatly favored by the Han dynasty. For example, in one batch of slips there are only two mentions of bows, but thirty mentions of crossbows. Crossbows were mass-produced using materials such as mulberry wood and brass. In 1068 during the Song Dynasty, such crossbows were capable of piercing a tree at 140 paces. Crossbows were used in numbers as large as 50,000 starting from the Qin dynasty and upwards of several hundred thousand during the Han. According to one authority the crossbow had become "nothing less than the standard weapon of the Han armies" by the second century BC. Han era carved stone images and paintings also contain images of horsemen wielding crossbows. Han soldiers were required to pull an "entry level" crossbow with a draw-weight of 76 kg/168lb to qualify as an entry level crossbowman, while it was claimed that a few elite troops were capable of bending crossbows by the hands-and-feet method, with a draw-weight in excess of 340 kg/750lb.

The Huainanzi advises its readers not to use crossbows in marshland where the surface is soft and it is hard to arm the crossbow with the foot. The Records of the Grand Historian, completed in 94 BC, mentions that Sun Bin defeated Pang Juan by ambushing him with a body of crossbowmen at the Battle of Maling. The Book of Han, finished 111 AD, lists two military treatises on crossbows.

In the 2nd century AD, Chen Yin gave advice on shooting with a crossbow in the Wuyue Chunqiu:

When shooting, the body should be as steady as a board, and the head mobile like an egg [on a table]; the left foot [forward] and the right foot perpendicular to it; the left hand as if leaning against a branch, the right hand as if embracing a child. Then grip the crossbow and take a sight on the enemy, hold the breath and swallow, then breathe out as soon as you have released [the arrow]; in this way you will be unperturbable. Thus after deep concentration, the two things separate, the [arrow] going, and the [bow] staying. When the right hand moves the trigger [in releasing the arrow] the left hand should not know it. One body, yet different functions [of parts], like a man and a girl well matched; such is the Dao of holding the crossbow and shooting accurately.

— Chen Yin

The crossbow was particularly effective against cavalry charges for two reasons. One, the crossbow could shoot further and harder than the bows of the Xiongnu, and two, even if the enemy went back to collect the quarrels, they had no way of using them because they were too short for their bows.

In 169 BC, Chao Cuo observed that by using the crossbow, it was possible to overcome the Xiongnu:

Of course, in mounted archery [using the short bow] the Yi and the Di are skilful, but the Chinese are good at using nu che. These carriages can be drawn up in the form of a laager which cannot be penetrated by cavalry. Moreover, the crossbows can shoot their bolts to a considerable range, and do more harm [lit. penetrate deeper] than those of the short bow. And again, if the crossbow bolts are picked up by the barbarians they have no way of making use of them. Recently the crossbow has unfortunately fallen into some neglect; we must carefully consider this... The strong crossbow [jing nu] and the [arcuballista shooting] javelins have a long range; something which the bows of the Huns can no way equal. The use of sharp weapons with long and short handles by disciplined companies of armoured soldiers in various combinations, including the drill of crossbow men alternately advancing [to shoot] and retiring [to load]; this is something which the Huns cannot even face. The troops with crossbows ride forward [cai guan shou] and shoot off all their bolts in one direction; this is something which the leather armour and wooden shields of the Huns cannot resist. Then the [horse-archers] dismount and fight forward on foot with sword and bill; this is something which the Huns do not know how to do.

— Chao Cuo

=== Special crossbows ===
In 99 BC, mounted multiple bolt crossbows were used as field artillery against attacking nomadic cavalry.

In 180 AD, Yang Xuan used a type of repeating crossbow powered by the movement of wheels:

...around A.D. 180 when Yang Xuan, Grand Protector of Lingling, attempted to suppress heavy rebel activity with badly inadequate forces. Yang's solution was to load several tens of wagons with sacks of lime and mount automatic crossbows on others. Then, deploying them into a fighting formation, he exploited the wind to engulf the enemy with clouds of lime dust, blinding them, before setting rags on the tails of the horses pulling these driverless artillery wagons alight. Directed into the enemy's heavily obscured formation, their repeating crossbows (powered by linkage with the wheels) fired repeatedly in random directions, inflicting heavy casualties. Amidst the obviously great confusion the rebels fired back furiously in self-defense, decimating each other before Yang's forces came up and largely exterminated them.

— Ralph Sawyer

The invention of the repeating crossbow has often been attributed to Zhuge Liang, but he in fact had nothing to do with it. This misconception is based on a record attributing improvements to the multiple bolt crossbows to him.

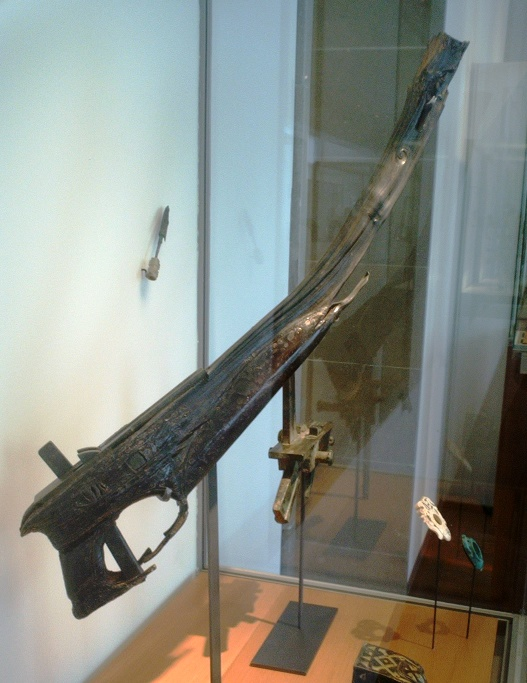
Ancient Chinese crossbow (2nd century BC). Guimet Museum, Paris.

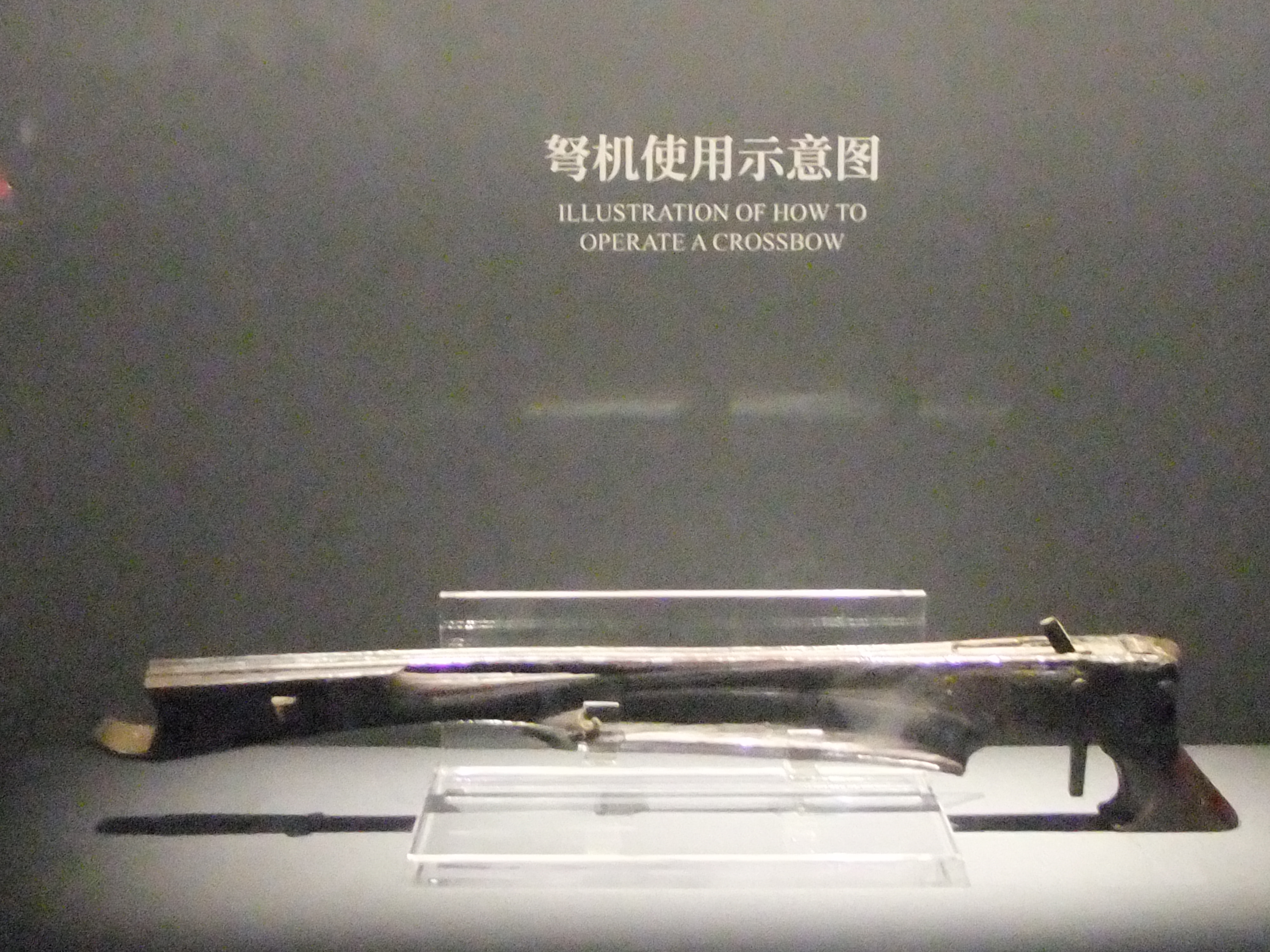
Western Han (206 B.C-24 A.D.) crossbow

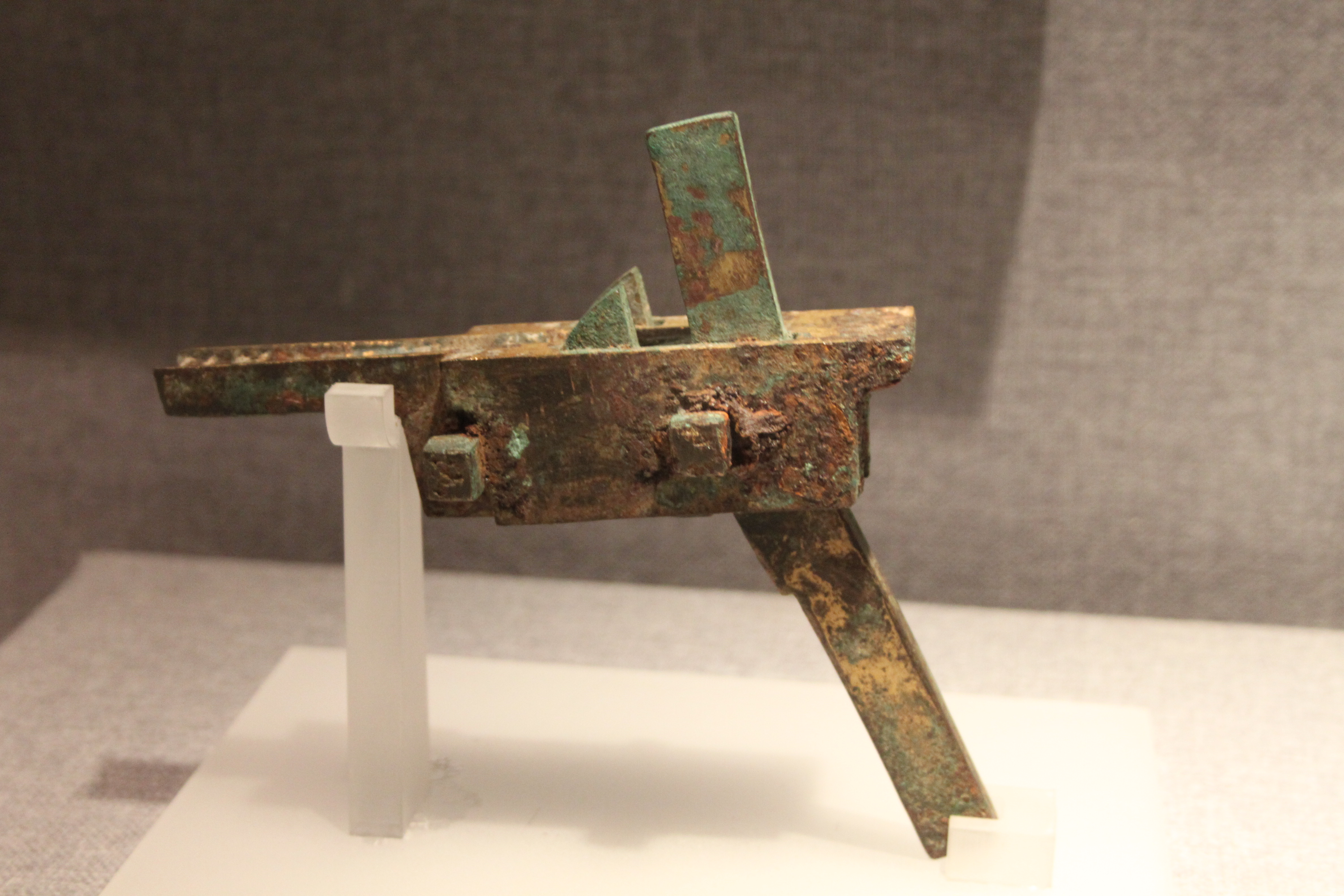
Han dynasty bronze crossbow trigger

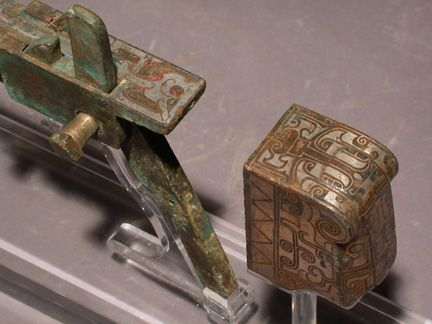
Western Han crossbow trigger and butt plate

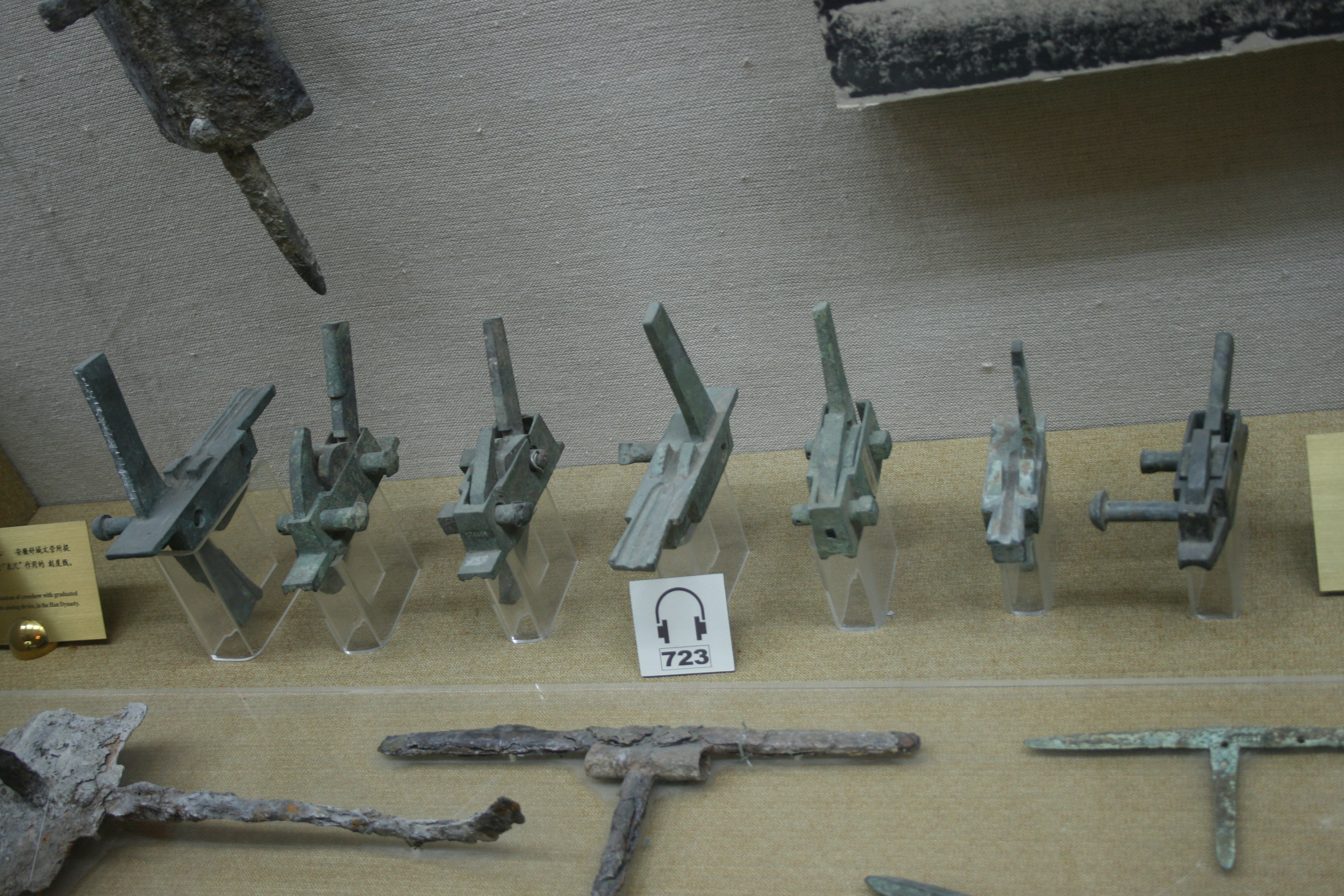
Han crossbow triggers

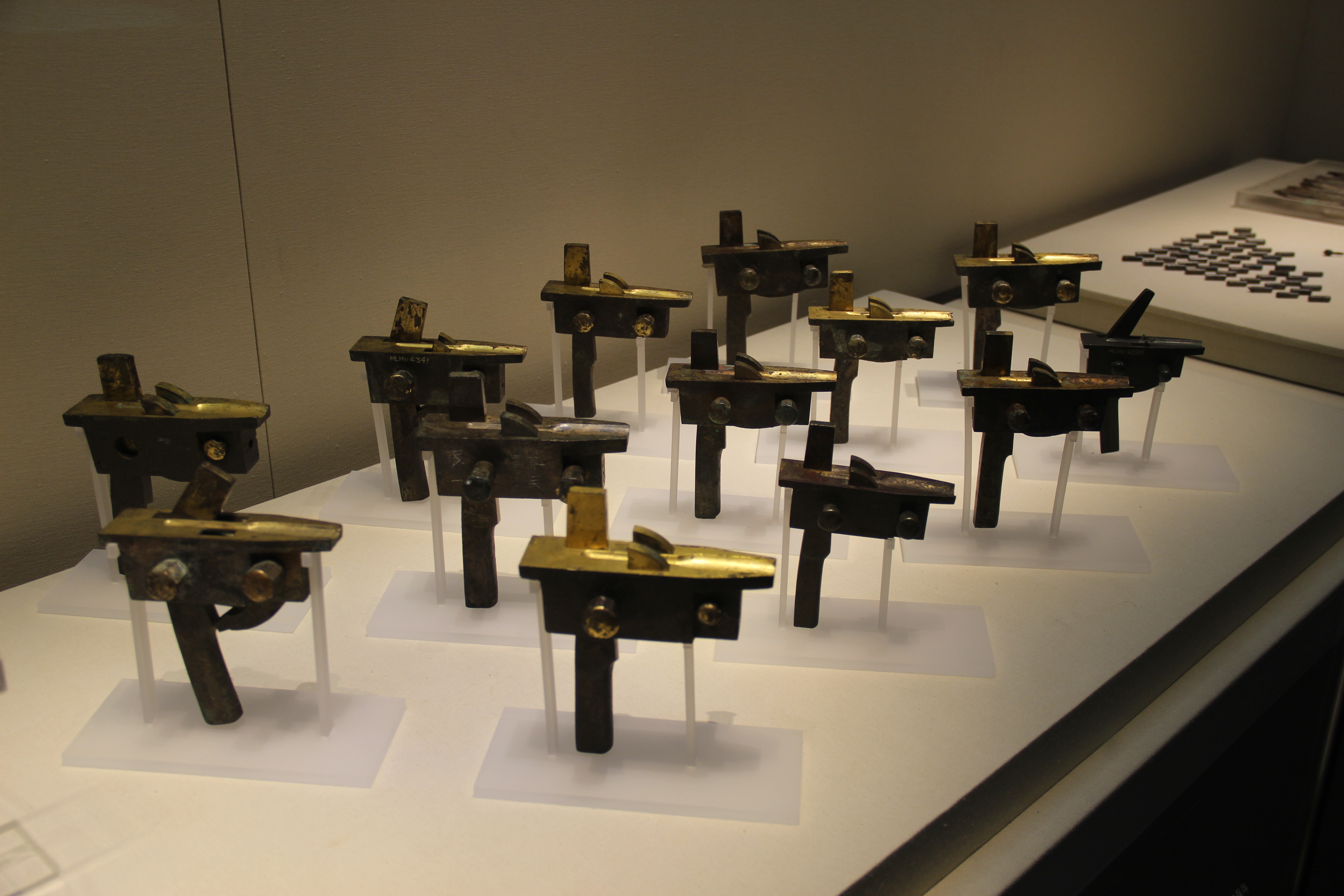
Han crossbow triggers

== Navy ==
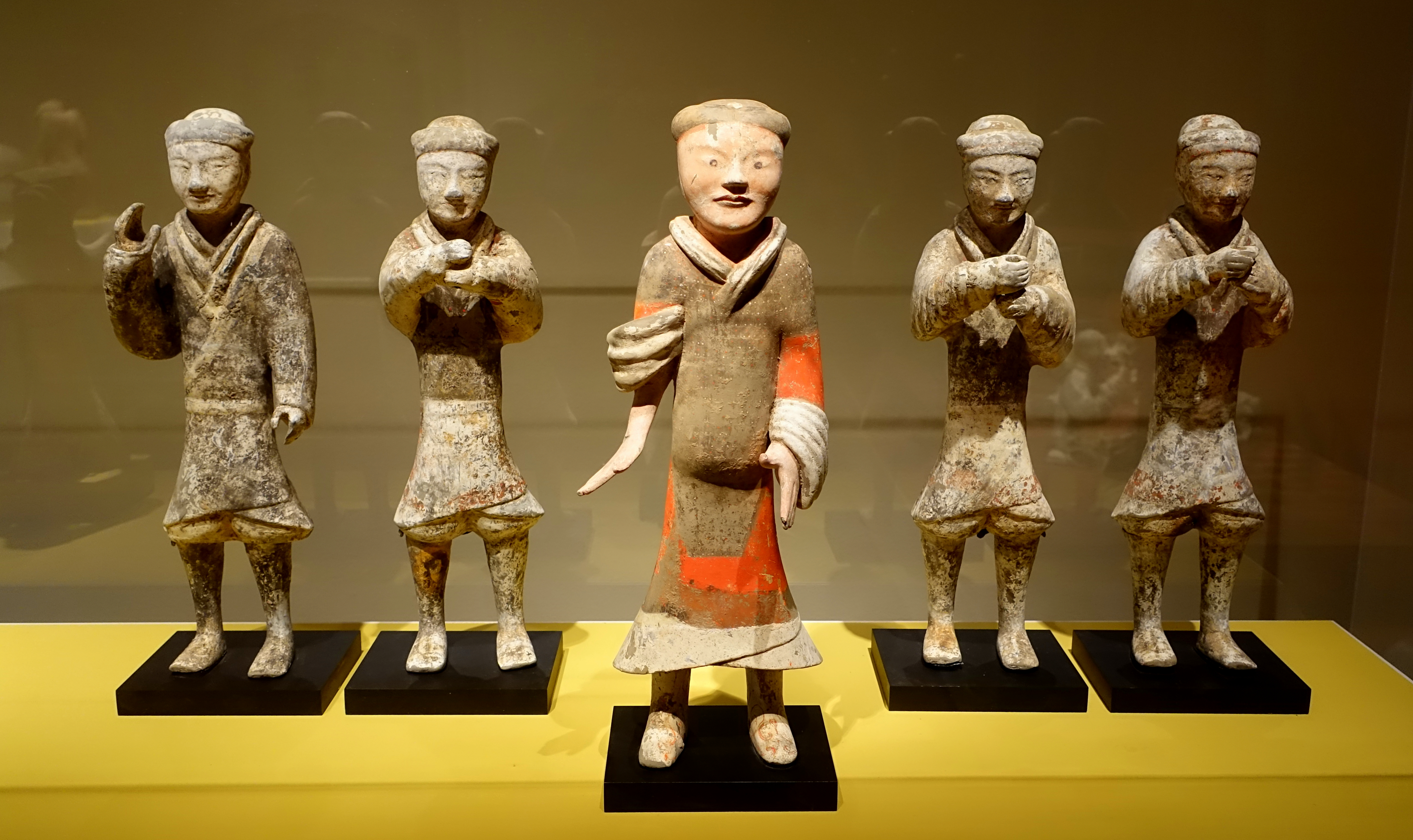
Armed soldiers and musicians from the Han dynasty, c. 150 BC

Beginning in the Han, Chinese warships had changed from clinker built (overlapping planks) to carvel built (side-by-side planks) construction, and multiple layers of superstructure were added. Anchors, rudders, sweeps and sails had become standard for warships. The navy was officially known as the “Tower ship navy" due to the importance of this type of warship in naval strategy. The navy was deployed to defend and then incorporate the Dong'ou state in 138 BC, followed by the 100,000 men-strong conquest of the Nanyue state in 112 BC, and then the suppression of the Minyue state rebellion in 110 BC.

The navy consisted primarily of two classes of ships: the deck ship (艦) and the spear ship (蒙衝). Deck ships resembled a cage with thick planking above deck, on deck and all around the hull as protection against projectiles. The spear ships were long and narrow, designed for ramming enemy ships. 200,000 seamen served in the deck ship fleet, divided into 3 squadrons, the Jianghuai Squadron in Yuchang (now Nanchang), the Kuaiji Squadron in Gouzhang (now near Ningbo) and the Qingqi Squadron in Shandong.

== Major campaigns and battles ==
- Chu–Han Contention

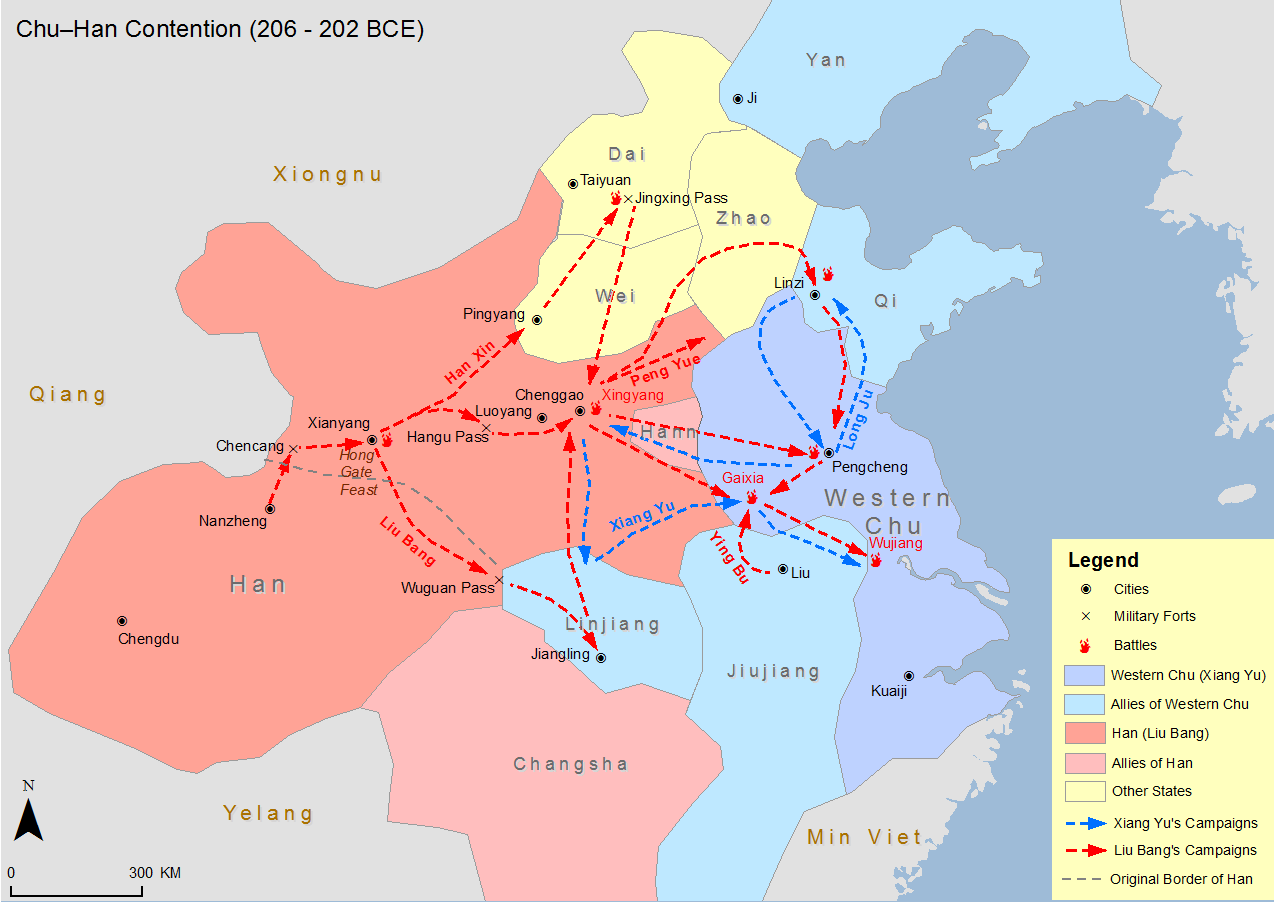
Chu–Han Contention, 206–202 BC

The Han dynasty and its vassal kingdoms in 195 BC

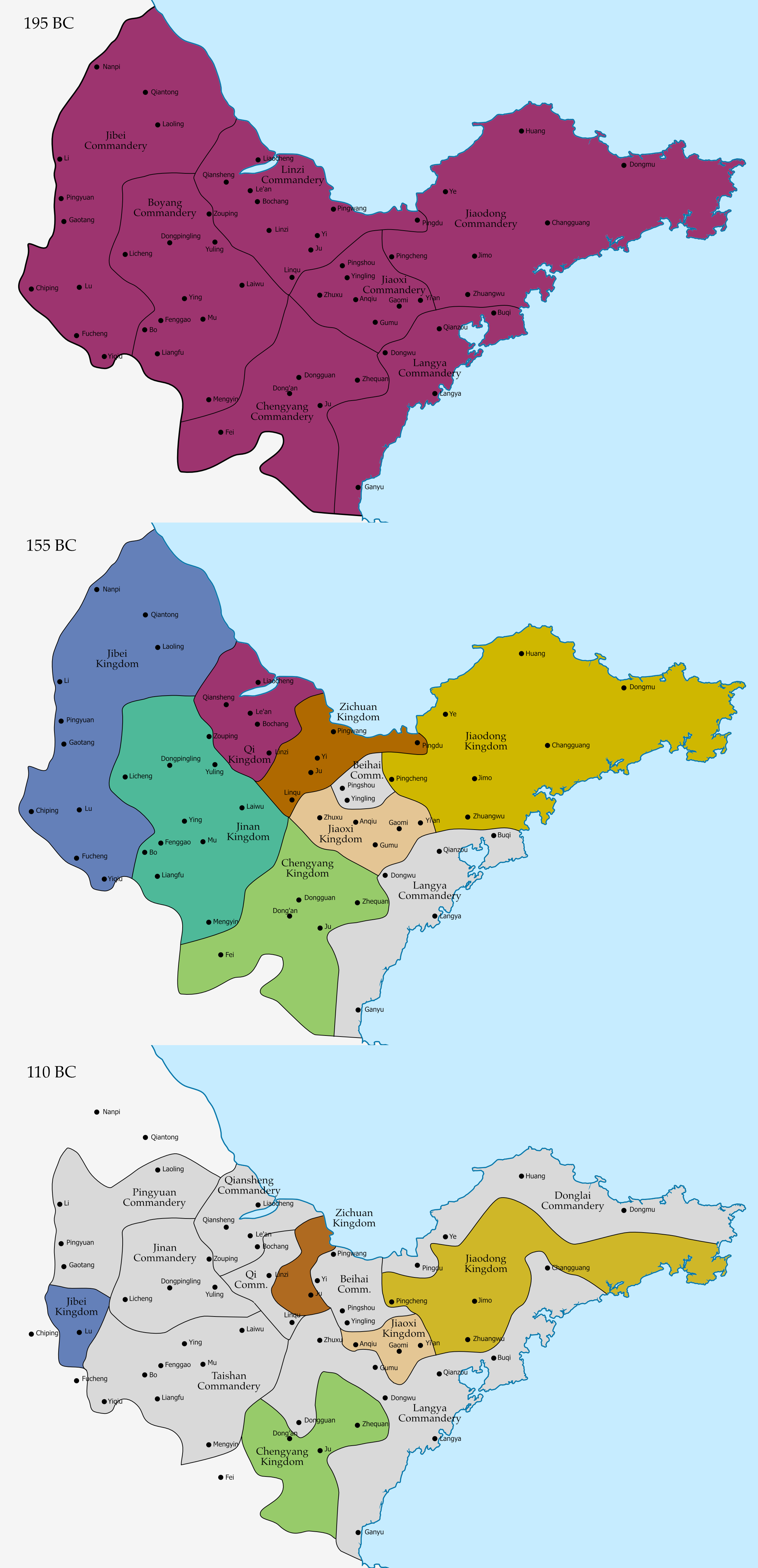
The Qi kingdoms from 195 BC to 110 BC

=== Subduing the kings ===
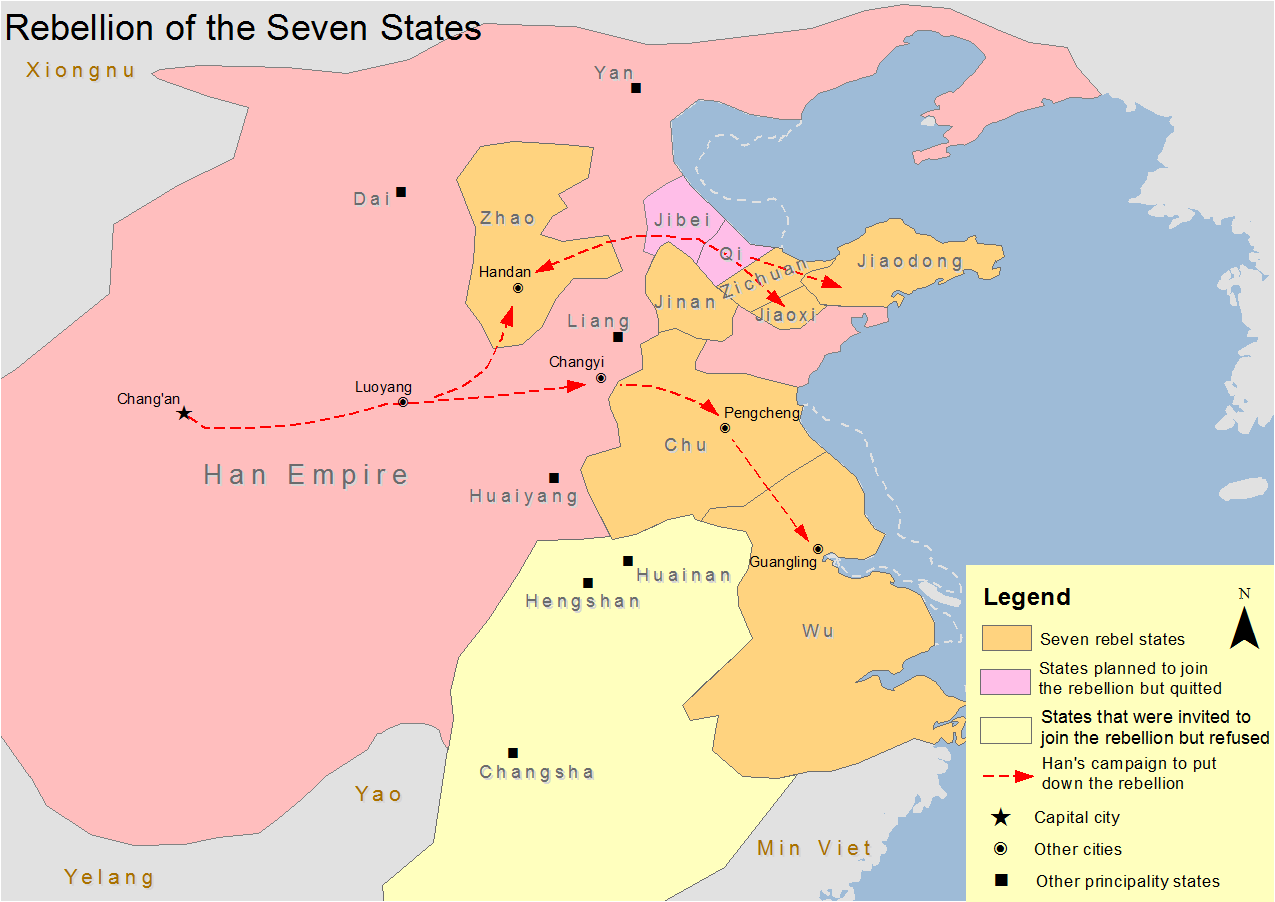
Rebellion of the Seven States, 154 BC

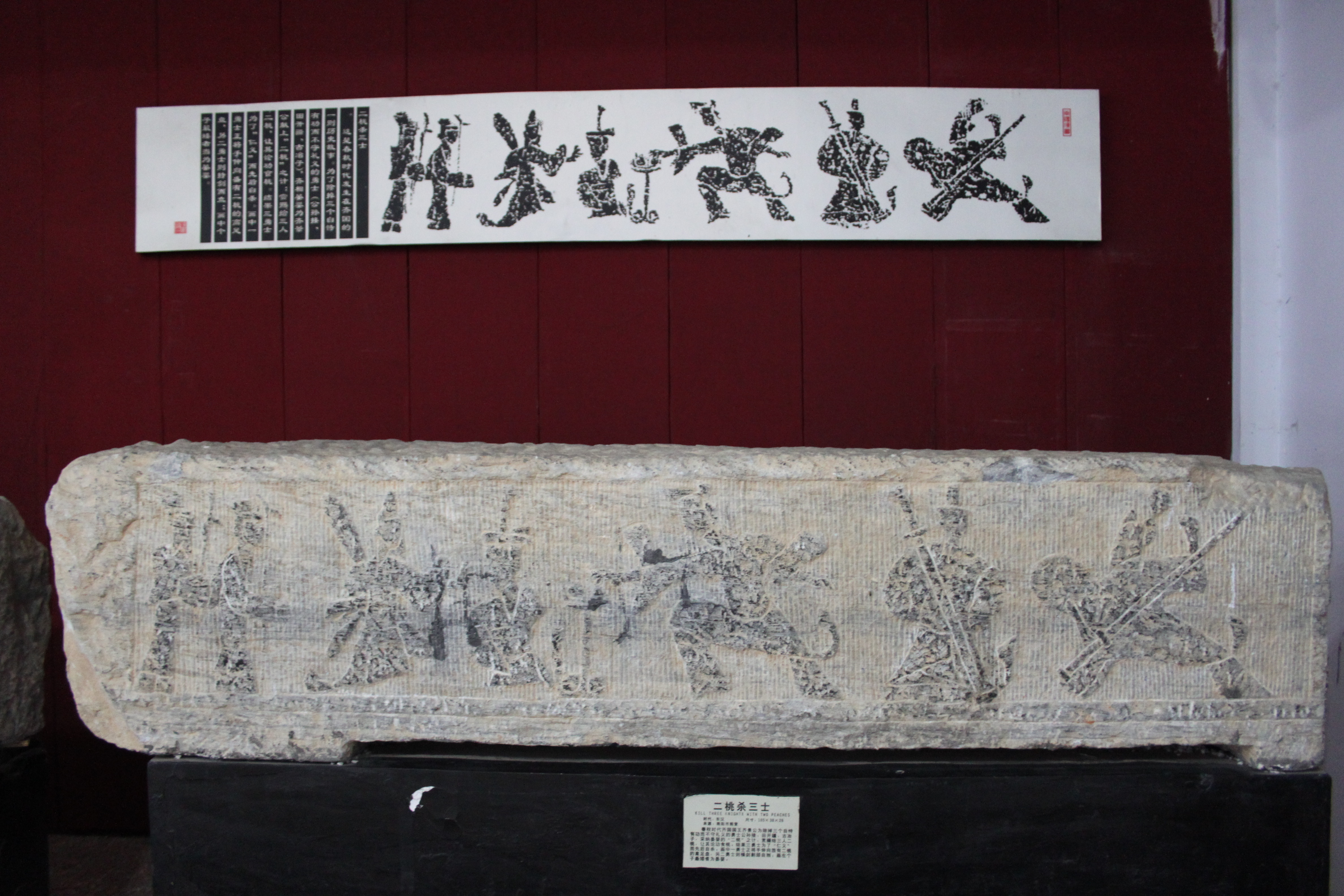
Two men holding swords, Han dynasty

After defeating Xiang Yu in 202 BC, Emperor Gaozu of Han's generals were made kings of their own semi-independent realms. Han Xin became King of Chu, Ying Bu King of Huainan, Peng Yue King of Liang, Xin King of Han, Wu Rui King of Changsha, Zang Tu King of Yan, Zhang Ao King of Zhao, Zou Wuzhu King of Minyue, and Zou Yao King of Dong'ou. Only Gong Wei and Zhao Tuo continued to resist at Linjiang and Panyu. Gong Wei was besieged by Liu Jia and Lu Wan for several months until he surrendered. Zhao Tuo, the founder of Nanyue, was too far away and thus ignored for the time being.

In the summer, Zang Tu, the King of Yan, marched on Dai to annex the region. Gaozu immediately led an army against him. His general Zhou Bo defeated the Yan forces and Zang Tu was captured. Lu Wan became the new King of Yan while Fan Kuai was sent to occupy Dai.

Li Ji, an ex-general of Xiang Yu, also revolted but failed to make any headway against Han forces and was forced to flee.

In 201 BC, courtiers accused Han Xin of plotting treason. They urged Gaozu to pre-emptively attack Han Xin. However Han Xin was brought in under the pretext of attending a meeting and demoted to Marquis of Huaiyin. The Kingdom of Chu was divided into two realms ruled by Liu Jia and Liu Jiao. Gaozu also made his son Liu Fei the King of Qi. Han Xin was eventually transferred to the northern frontier to defend it against the Xiongnu.

Now both the country and the tactics of the Huns are different from those of the Chinese. Their lands are nothing but mountain-slopes with ways going up and down and winding through gorges in and out; in such regions our Chinese horses cannot compete with theirs. Along the tracks at the edge of precipices still they ride and shoot; our Chinese horse-archers can hardly do the like. Rain and storm, exhaustion and fatigue, hunger and thirst, nothing do they fear; our Chinese soldiers can in these things hardly compare with them. Such are the merits of the Huns.

— Chao Cuo

In 200 BC, Xin, King of Han, surrendered to the Xiongnu at Mayi, Shuofang, Dai Commandery, and joined them in raiding Han territory. Gaozu led an army against them and scattered their forces, defeating them several times before they retreated. Later Xin set up Zhao Li as King of Zhao and marched south against Gaozu. They too were defeated. Seeing the influence the Xiongnu had on his vassals, Gaozu marched north with a large army to confront them. However his men suffered from inadequate clothing to ward off the cold and a lack of supplies, so Gaozu left them behind and advanced to Pingcheng with a smaller party. Modu Chanyu saw his chance to turn the tide and immediately surrounded the city, cutting the emperor off from the rest of his army. It's not clear why, but the Chanyu eventually withdrew some of his men. Sima Qian suggests his consort persuaded him to let the emperor escape. However a prolonged siege would have been impractical anyway since Xin's infantry never made it on time. Seeing the Chanyu's thinned lines, Gaozu sortied out and broke the siege. When Han reinforcements arrived, the Xiongnu withdrew. This came to be known as the Battle of Baideng. Gaozu's narrow escape from capture by the Xiongnu convinced him to make peace with his nomadic enemy. He sent one of his daughters to the Chanyu and offered him silk, wine, and food stuffs. The Chanyu accepted the offer and restricted himself to minor raids throughout the duration of Gaozu's reign.

The hero, Modun, was a gifted child, but his father, Chanyu Touman, wanted the son of another of his wives to succeed him. To eliminate the competitor, he sent the young Modun to the Wusun people as a hostage; then he attacked the Wusun, hoping that they would kill their hostage in retribution. Modun escaped his fate and returned to the Xiongnu and his father, who was impressed with his ability as a warrior. This was to be Touman's undoing. Modun gathered a group of warriors who were bound to remain absolutely loyal to him. To train them, as the story goes, Modun ordered each man to shoot Modun's favorite horse, summarily executing any who refused; then he ordered each to shoot Modun's favorite wife, but again a few hesitated, a mistake they paid for with their own lives. Once the lesson had been learned, Modun ordered his followers to shoot his father. Apparently this time no one failed to discharge his arrows. Having in this way eliminated his own father, Modun became the chanyu, and, immediately upon succeeding to the throne, proceeded to defend the Xiongnu from the aggression of other nomadic tribes. His success allowed him to create a large empire that would humiliate the Han dynasty in 198 b.c. and, over the next few decades, impose its rule widely: from Manchuria to northern and western Mongolia, to the Altai region, to the Tianshan region, and beyond.

— Nicola Di Cosmo

In 198 BC, Wang Huang of Zhao and Chen Xi of Dai rebelled. Gaozu ordered Peng Yue, King of Liang, to join him in battle against the rebel forces, but he refused.

In 197 BC, Gaozu eliminated the Zhao and Dai rebels. Gaozu's son Liu Heng became the new King of Dai. Peng Yue feared that Gaozu would come for him for his refusal to aid the empire against the rebels, so he began preparations to rebel. When Gaozu received wind of this, he had Peng Yue arrested and executed. In the summer, Ying Bu, the King of Huainan, rebelled and seized the lands of Liu Jia, King of Jing. The King of Chu, Liu Jiao, fled his territory. Gaozu confronted him in battle and defeated Ying Bu's forces. Ying Bu fled but was defeated again and slain, however Gaozu was wounded in battle by an arrow. Gaozu's son, Liu Chang, became the new King of Huainan.

In 196 BC, Han Xin was arrested and executed despite some reservations from Gaozu, who still considered him to be the finest soldier of his era. Xin was finally killed when he was cornered at the town of Canhe by Han general Chai Wu.

In 195 BC, Han general Zhou Bo captured Chen Xi, who revealed that Lu Wan, King of Yan, had supported him in his rebellion. Zhou Bo stormed the Yan capital of Ji, forcing Lu Wan to seek refuge with the Xiongnu. One of Lu Wan's generals, Wei Man, fled east and usurped the throne of Gojoseon in Korea, beginning the era of Wiman Joseon. Meanwhile, Gaozu succumbed to the wound he received in battle against Ying Bu, and died on 28 February, 195 BC. He was succeeded by his 15-year-old son Liu Ying, posthumously Emperor Hui of Han.

In 185 BC, the Han outlawed trade of iron with Nanyue, depriving them of the means to make weapons. In retaliation, Zhao Tuo proclaimed himself emperor and attacked Wu Rui, King of Changsha, taking a number of border towns.

In 181 BC, a Han army marched south against Nanyue. However the hot climate and diseases of the region prevented them from advancing any further into mountains of Nanyue (in modern Guangdong and Guangxi).

On Empress Lü's death in 180 BC, the Lü clan usurped the authority of the chief ministers. Liu Xiang, King of Qi, raised the banner of rebellion and called on the Liu clan to unite against the Lü. Zhou Bo overthrew the Lü clan and made Liu Heng, King of Dai, the new emperor, posthumously known as Emperor Wen of Han. Under the reign of Emperor Wen, the Han made peace with Nanyue and withdrew their army from the border. In return, Zhao Tuo announced that he only used the title of emperor in order to overawe the various kings of the south such as the Xiou (Western Ou), Minyue, and Luoluo. He received nominal vassalage from the Han court and the iron trade was resumed between the two states.

In 179 BC, Modu Chanyu crossed the Yellow River and raided Yunzhong Commandery. An army of loyal tribes 85,000 led by Guan Ying managed to repel the Xiongnu invaders and forced them to withdraw.

In 178 BC, Liu Xingju, King of Jibei, rebelled. Han general Chen Wu crushed the rebel army, after which Liu Xingju committed suicide. Meanwhile, the Xiongnu overran the Yuezhi in Gansu and the Tarim Basin.

In 166 BC, Xiongnu forces under Laoshang raided within sight of Chang'an and carried off a large number of people and animals.

In 165 BC, the Xiongnu returned and raided within sight of Chang'an again.

In 164 BC, the Xiongnu under Laoshang overran Gansu and the Tarim Basin completely, driving out the Yuezhi and Sakas, who invaded Bactria and occupied Sogdia. The Yuezhi would be pushed out by the Wusun, forcing them further into Sogdia and driving out the Sakas. The Sakas went to Parthia and some to India. A group known as the Lesser Yuezhi fled into southern Gansu and merged with the Qiang population. Laoshang also defeated a group of people in northern Bactria known as the Hathal and turned their chief's skull into a drinking cup. From this western position the Xiongnu conducted yearly raids on the Han.

In 155 BC, Chao Cuo convinced Emperor Jing of Han to take territory from the kingdoms of Chu, Zhao, and Jiaoxi.

According to the Bingfa, where there are waterways fifteen feet wide, chariots cannot pass. Where rocks are piled up among the mountain forests, and rivers circulate between hills covered with woods and thickets; there the infantry arm comes into its own. Here two chariots or two horsemen do not equal one foot-soldier. Where there are rolling hills, wide open spaces and flat plains, there chariots and cavalry find their use, and ten foot-soldiers are not as good as one horseman. Flat places intersected with gorges, and abrupt declivities affording wide outlooks-commanding positions such as these should be held by archers and crossbowmen. Here a hundred men armed with hand-to-hand weapons are not equal to one archer. When two forces oppose one another on a plain covered with short grasses they are free to manoeuvre back and forth, and then the long bill (changji) is the right weapon. Three men with swords and shields are not as effective as one so armed. Among reeds and rushes and thickets of bamboo, where the undergrowth is rich and abundant, pikes and short spears are needed. Two men with long bills are not as good there as one with a pike. But among winding ways and dangerous precipices the sword and shield are to be preferred, and three archers or crossbowmen will not do as well as one swordsman.

— Chao Cuo

In 154 BC, the Rebellion of the Seven States erupted. Liu Pi, King of Wu, was ordered to surrender two provinces. He immediately rebelled with the support of Liu Wu King of Chu, Liu Sui King of Zhao, and the Qi kings of Jiaoxi, Jiaodong, Zichuan, and Ji'nan. The court tried to appease them at first by executing Chao Cuo, however this did not mollify them, and they continued their march west. Opposing them were the emperor's brother Liu Wu King of Liang, and Liu Zhi King of Jibei. The rebel forces captured Jibei and moved south to besiege Suiyang, however they were met by a strong line of fortified towns which they failed to take, halting their advance. Han forces under Zhou Yafu retaliated by seizing Changyi, cutting off the rebel supply route, and advanced to Xiayi before digging in and refusing to do battle. He did however send light cavalry to raid the rebel lines. Without cavalry of their own, they could do nothing to stop him. Soon the rebel army was starving and in desperation they decided to storm Changyi, even managing to penetrate the town for a short while before they were repulsed. They tried a diversionary tactic, attacking one corner of the city with a small force while their main army assaulted the other side. Zhou Yafu anticipated this and concentrated his forces toward repulsing the main rebel assault. Having failed to defeat Zhou Yafu, the rebel army lifted the siege of Suiyang and marched south, only to be overtaken by Zhou and defeated. Liu Wu, King of Chu, committed suicide. Liu Pi escaped further south to Dong'ou (Eastern Ou) with only a few thousand men and was killed by the natives a few months later. The kings of Zhao and the four minor Qi kingdoms all committed suicide one by one as the Han army reached their capitals.

In 139 BC, Minyue invaded Dong'ou, which appealed to the Han for help. An imperial army under Zhuang Zhu came to its aid and forced Zou Wuzhu of Minyue to withdraw south. However the people of Dong'ou were resettled north of the Changjiang and their territory was annexed by Minyue anyway.

In 137 BC, Minyue invaded Nanyue. An imperial army was sent against them, but the Minyue king's brother Zou Yushan usurped the throne and sued for peace, disbanding the army.

=== Defeating the Xiongnu ===
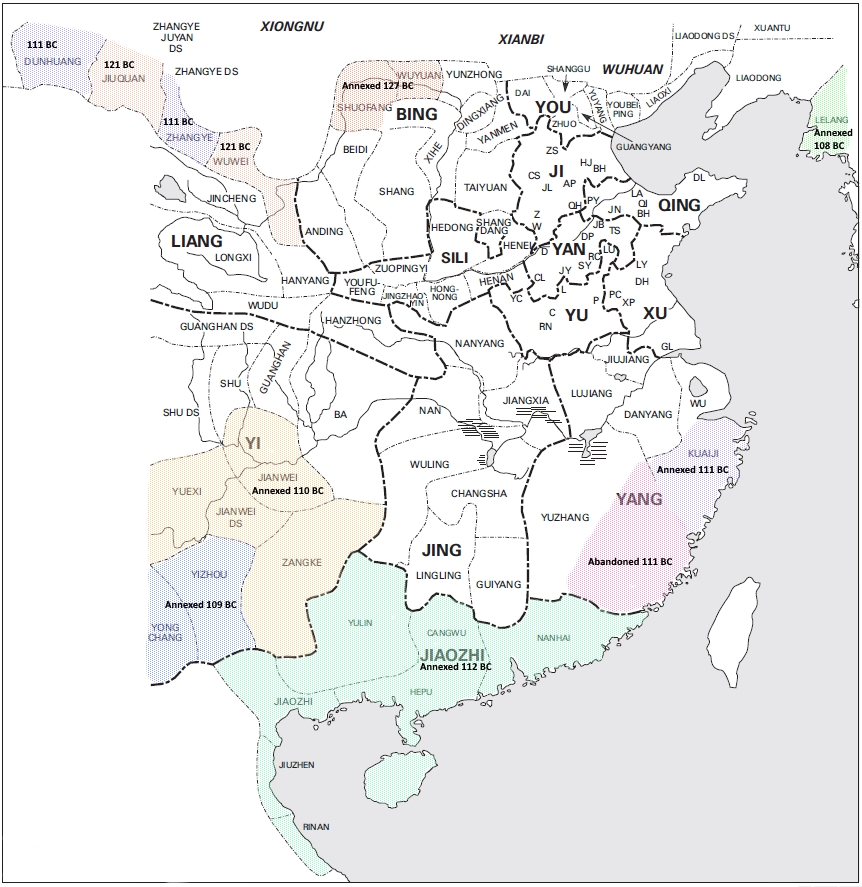
Expansion of the Han dynasty

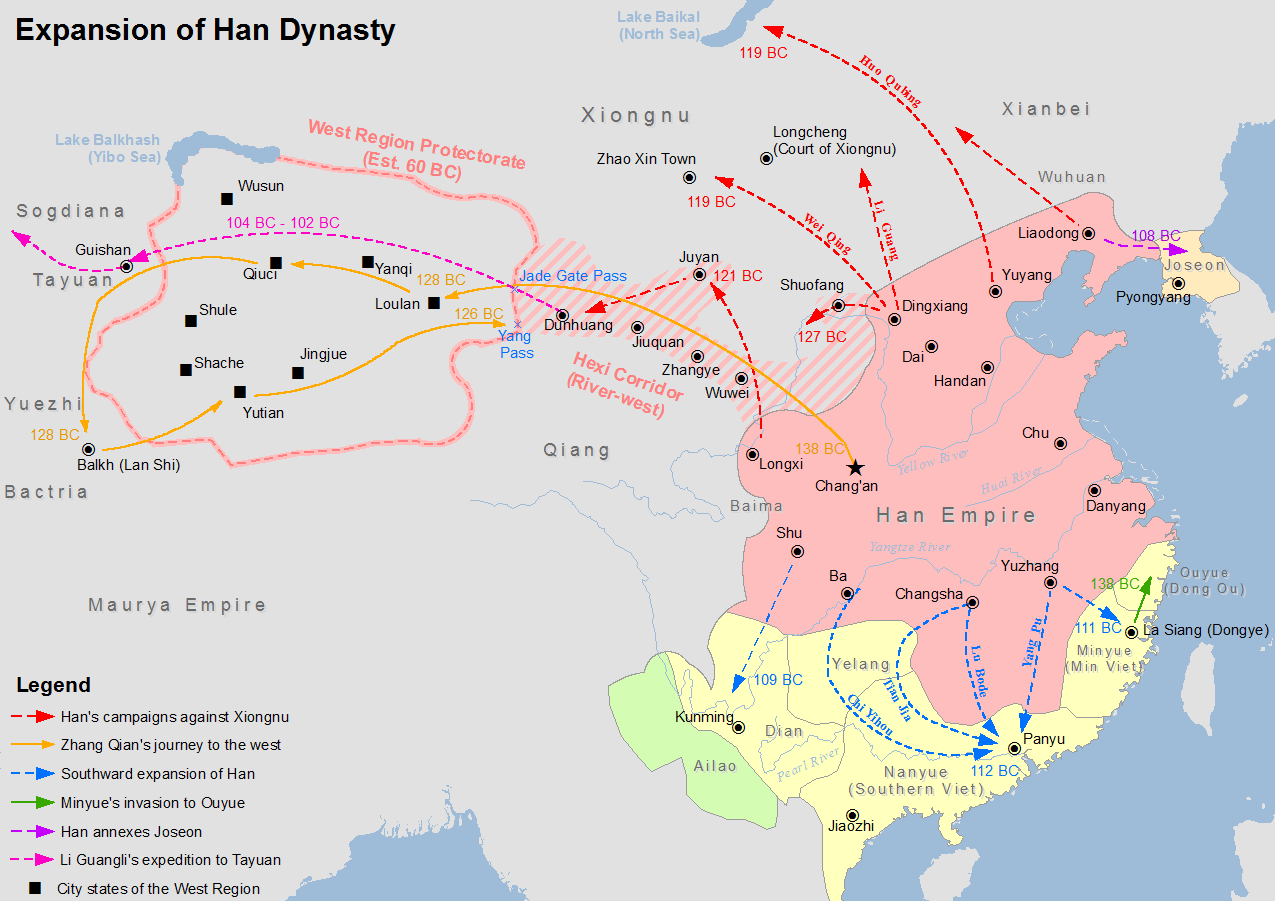
Han campaigns of conquest

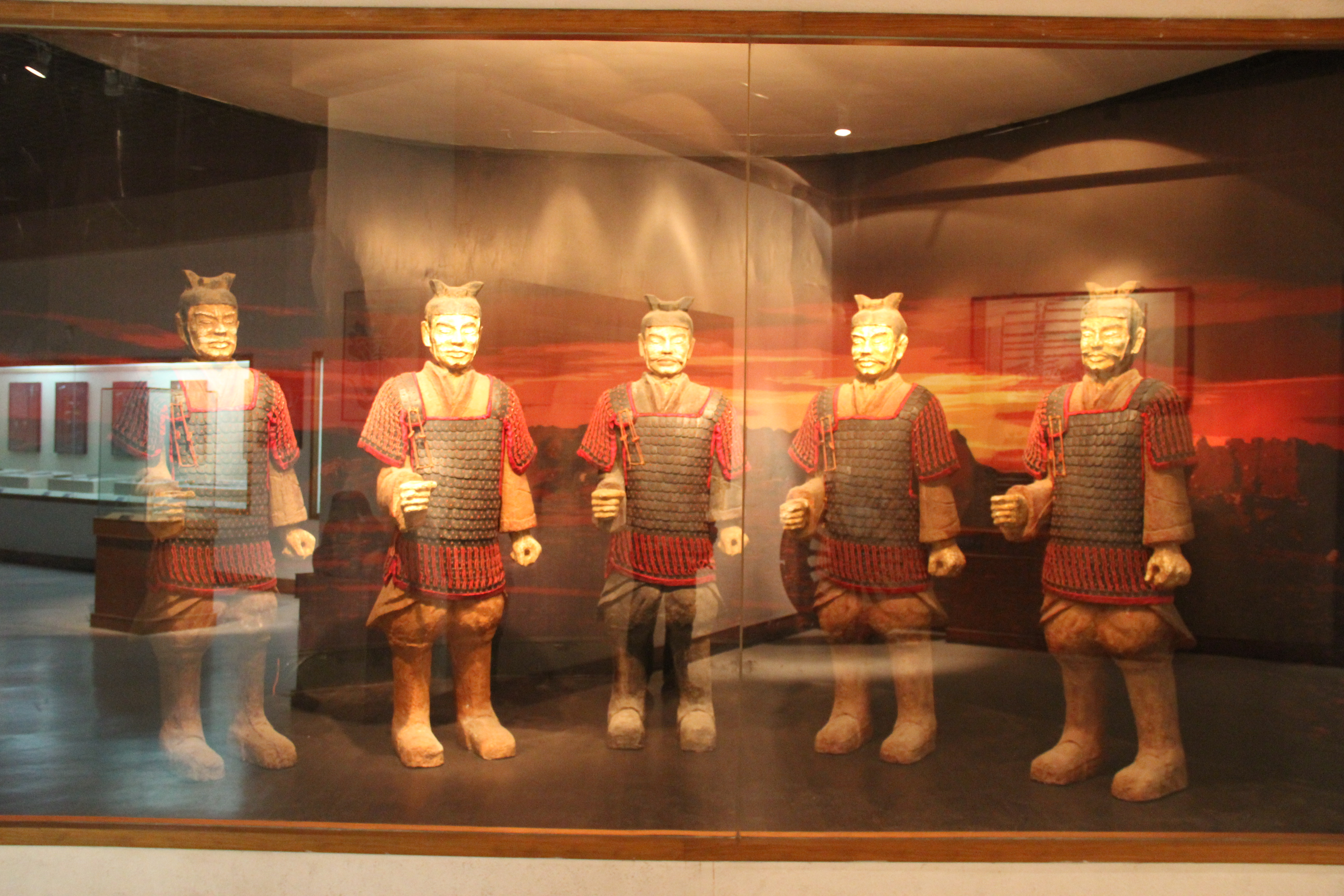
Replica of Han dynasty officers in armor.

In the summer of 133 BC, the Xiongnu Chanyu Junchen led a force of 100,000 to attack Mayi in Shuofang, Dai Commandery. Wang Hui and two other generals attempted to ambush them at Mayi with a large force of 300,000, but Junchen retreated after learning about the ambush from a captured local warden. Wang Hui decided not to give chase and was sentenced to death. He committed suicide. The Han army abandoned chariots after this point.

Chariots were still used as the chief weapon in wars against the Xiongnu during the period of Emperor Wen, and their relative lack of mobility prevented the Han force from launching any distant expeditions or gaining major victories. This fighting method survived even into the early period of Emperor Wu. For example, in his first war against the Xiongnu, in 133 B.C., a large number of war chariots were mobilized as the chief military component. But when the chanyu of the Xiongnu, realizing that he had been tricked by misinformation provided by a Han spy, retreated to his territory, the Han forces were unable to overtake him. Emperor Wu then decided to give up completely the use of war chariots.

— Chun-shu Chang

In the spring of 129 BC, Wei Qing and three other generals led a cavalry force of 40,000 in an attack on the Xiongnu at the frontier markets of Shanggu. Wei Qing successfully killed several thousand Xiongnu and took 700 prisoners. General Gongsun Ao was defeated and lost 7,000 men. He was reduced to commoner status. Li Guang was defeated and captured but managed to escape by feigning death and returned to base. He was reduced to commoner status. Gongsun He failed to find the Xiongnu. That winter the Xiongnu attacked Yuyang in You Province in retaliation.

In the autumn of 128 BC, Wei Qing and Li Xi led a force of 40,000 and defeated the Xiongnu north of Yanmen Commandery.

In the spring of 127 BC, the Xiongnu raided Liaoxi and Yanmen Commandery. Han Anguo tried to stop them with 700 men but failed and retreated to Yuyang. When Wei Qing and two other generals arrived, the Xiongnu fled. Wei Qing pushed forward and successfully evicted the Xiongnu south of the Yellow River, killed 2,300 Xiongnu at Gaoque (Shuofang), and captured 3,075 Xiongnu and one million livestock at Fuli (Wuyuan).

In 126 BC, the Xiongnu led a force of 90,000 under the Wise King (Tuqi) of the Right to attack Dai Commandery, killing its grand administrator Gong You. They also raided Dingxiang and Shang, taking several thousand captives.

[In the Xiongnu state] there are the Left and Right Wise Kings, Left and Right Luli Kings, Left and Right Generals, Left and Right Commandants, Left and Right Household Administrators and Left and Right Gudu Marquises. The Xiongnu word for “wise” is tuqi, therefore they often refer to the Heir Apparent as the Tuqi King of the Left. Starting from the Wise Kings of the Left and Right, down to the Household Administrators, the most important ones [command] ten thousand horsemen, the least important a few thousand; altogether they are referred to as the twenty-four high dignitaries.

— Records of the Grand Historian

In the spring of 124 BC, Wei Qing and four other generals led a force of 100,000, mostly light cavalry, against the Xiongnu. The Wise King (Tuqi) of the Right assumed they would turn back after he retreated, but they did not, and he was surprised at his camp. The Han emerged victorious, capturing ten petty chieftains, 15,000 Xiongnu, and one million livestock.

In the spring of 123 BC, Wei Qing and others led 100,000 cavalry against the Xiongnu, killing and capturing 3,000 north of Dingxiang. However Su Jian and Zhao Xin advanced too far with only 3,000 and were cut down. Zhao Xin defected while Su Jian managed to escape.

In 122 BC, a Xiongnu force of 10,000 raided Shanggu.

In the spring of 121 BC, Huo Qubing led a force of 10,000 cavalry and killed 8,960 Xiongnu west of the Yanzhi Mountains (in modern Gansu). In the summer he and several others marched west. Huo made it as far as the Qilian Mountains south of Jiuquan, killing and capturing 33,000 Xiongnu. The Xiongnu also invaded Yanmen Commandery so Li Guang and Zhang Qian gave chase. Li Guang was suddenly surrounded by 40,000 Xiongnu under the Wise King (Tuqi) of the Left but was able to hold off repeated attacks for two days until Zhang Qian arrived and the Xiongnu retreated. Zhang Qian was demoted to commoner status for arriving late.

Now the chanyu has recently suffered at the hands of the Han and as a result the region occupied by the Hunye king has been depopulated. The Manyi peoples are typically greedy for Han goods. If we now take this opportunity and send rich bribes and gifts to the Wu-sun and persuade them to move farther east and occupy the region which formerly belonged to the Hunye king, then the Han could conclude a treaty of brotherhood with them, and, under the circumstances, they would surely do as we say. If we could get them to obey us, it would be like cutting off the right arm of the Xiongnu. Once an alliance has been forged with the Wusun, states from Daxia (Bactria) to its West could all be induced to come to court and become our outer vassals.

— Zhang Qian

In 120 BC, the Xiongnu raided Youbeiping and Dingxiang, carrying off 1,000 captives.

In the summer of 119 BC, Wei Qing and Huo Qubing led a large force of 100,000 cavalry, 200,000 infantry, and 140,000 supply horses against the Xiongnu. When the Han forces arrived, they found the Xiongnu already prepared and waiting. Wei ensconced himself into a fortified ring of chariots and sent out 5,000 cavalry to probe the enemy. The Xiongnu chanyu Yizhixie responded with 10,000 cavalry. The two sides skirmished until evening when a strong wind arose, at which point Wei committed most of his cavalry and encircled the Xiongnu. Yizhixie attempted to break out of the encirclement but lost control of his men and routed. Huo's forces advanced by another route and defeated the Wise King (Tuqi) of the Left. Li Guang failed to rendezvous on time and committed suicide. A hundred thousand horses were lost during the campaign leading up to the Battle of Mobei, crippling Han cavalry forces for some time.

The Xiongnu surrounded Li Guang's army and wiped out most of the men. Zhang Qian was accused of having arrived late at his rendezvous with Li Guang and was sentenced to execution, but on payment of a fine he was allowed to become a commoner. This same year the Han sent the swift cavalry general Huo Qubing against the Xiongnu. He defeated and killed 30,000 or 40,000 of the Xiongnu in the western region and rode as far as the Qilian Mountains. The following year the Hunye king led his barbarian hordes and surrendered to the Han, and the Xiongnu completely disappeared from the region from Jincheng and Hexi west along the Southern Mountains to the Salt Swamp. Occasionally Xiongnu scouts would appear, but even they were rare. Two years later the Han armies attacked the Shanyu and chased him north of the desert.

— Records of the Grand Historian

=== Conquering south, east, and west ===
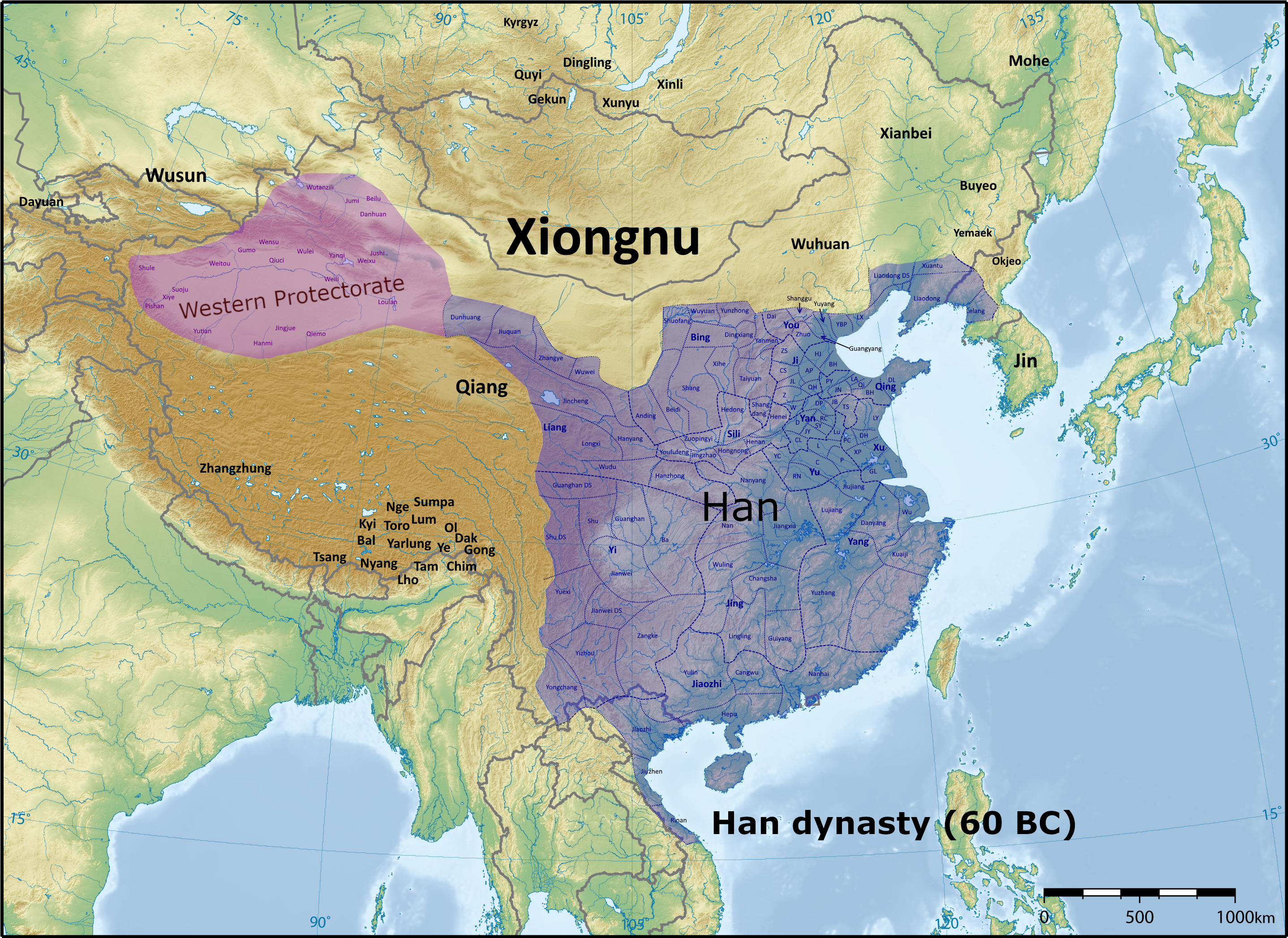
Han dynasty (60 BC)

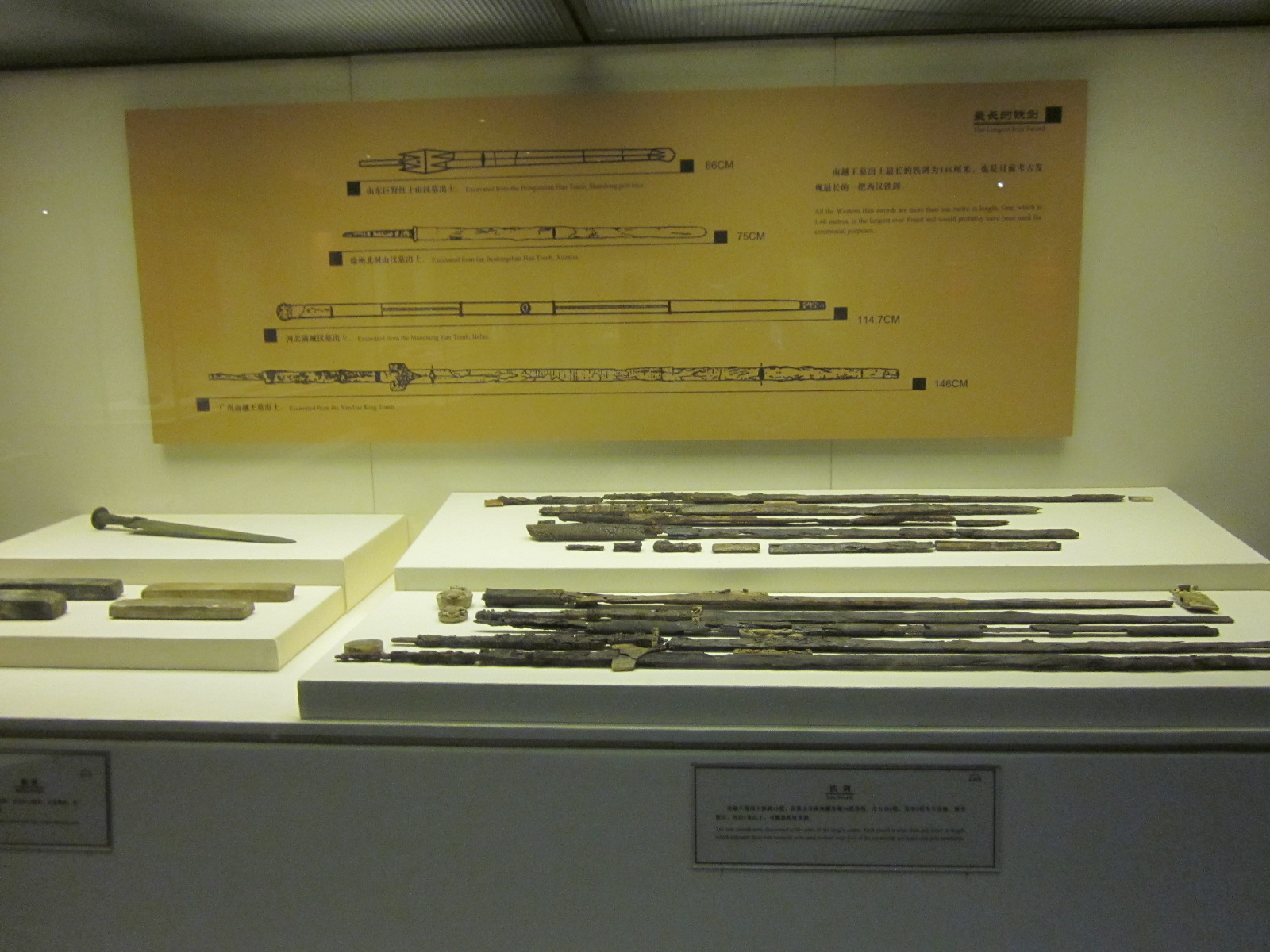
Nanyue weapons

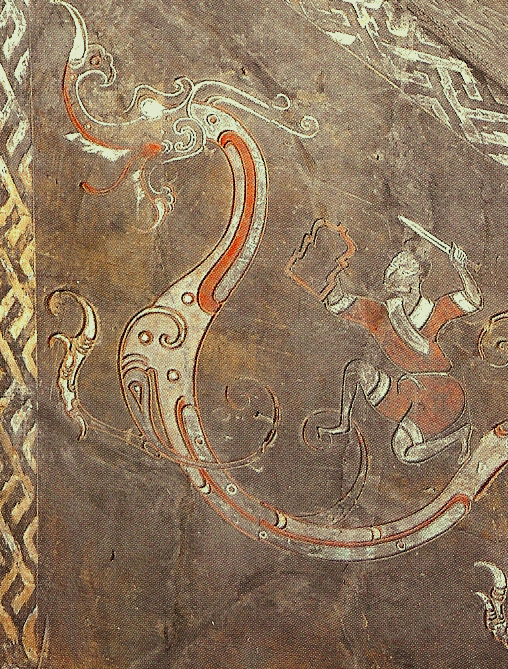
Warrior with shield and sword, Western Han

In 116 BC, the Xiongnu raided Liang Province.

In 113 BC, chief minister Lü Jia of Nanyue prevented its king Zhao Xing from visiting the Han court. Han Qianqiu was sent to kill Lü Jia. He advanced into Nanyue with only 2,000 men, capturing several towns, until his local allies turned on him, slaying him and his men.

In 112 BC, the Han invaded eastern Tibet with 25,000 cavalry on grounds of Qiang raiding.

In the autumn of 111 BC, Gongsun He and Zhao Ponu led 25,000 cavalry against the Xiongnu, but failed to engage them. Lu Bode and Yang Pu led a force of 35,000 against Nanyue.

In 110 BC, Han forces defeated Nanyue and annexed the region. The king of Minyue, Zou Yushan, thought he would be attacked as well, and pre-emptively attacked Han garrisons. In the winter the Han sent another force and defeated Minyue. The area was abandoned however until further colonization in 200 AD. Emperor Wu of Han assembled his forced in Shuofang and challenged Wuwei Chanyu to meet him in battle. Wuwei declined.

In 109 BC, the Han sent a force of 5,000 under Guo Chang and Wei Guang to Yelang and Dian Kingdom, forcing them to submit to the Han. A Yue rebellion led by Wu Yang resulted in the removal of all the people in Minyue further north. A Han envoy returning from Gojoseon slew his escort and claimed to have slain a general. Gojoseon retaliated by invading Liaodong.

In 108 BC, a Han army of 57,000 under Xun Zhi and Yang Pu invaded Gojoseon. Xun Zhi advanced too far and was defeated. Yang Pu made it to Wanggeom-seong and was defeated. In spring they regrouped and laid siege to Wanggeom-seong. Xun Zhi got into a fight with Yang Pu and had him arrested, combining both their forces under one general. Eventually the people of the city killed their king, Ugeo of Gojoseon, and surrendered. Zhao Ponu sallied out with 25,000 cavalry against the Xiongnu but could not find them. He then attacked Loulan Kingdom and Jushi Kingdom with only 700 cavalry, subjugating them.

In the autumn of 104 BC, Li Guangli led a force of 20,000 convicted conscripts and 6,000 cavalry against Dayuan. The oasis states refused to provide food so they had to attack them to procure necessities. Han deserters who surrendered to Dayuan taught them how to cast metal into coins and weapons.

In the summer of 103 BC, Zhao Ponu attacked the Xiongnu with 20,000 cavalry, but was surrounded and captured. Li Guangli reached Yucheng (Uzgen) but could not take the city and returned to Dunhuang.

In the autumn of 102 BC, Li Guangli led a much larger army of 60,000 men, 100,000 oxen, 30,000 horses, and 20,000 supply animals against Dayuan. The oasis states surrendered and provided food upon seeing the overwhelming force. The only state which resisted was Luntai, so the entire populace was massacred. The army bypassed Yucheng (Uzgen) and headed straight for Dayuan's capital Ershi (Khujand). There the Han crossbowmen easily defeated Dayuan's army and laid siege to the city. After 40 days and diverting the river from the city, removing their water supply, the inhabitants killed their king and provided the Han army 3,000 horses. A scout force under Wang Shencheng was defeated at Yucheng (Uzgen), so Li sent a detachment under Shangguan Jie to storm Yucheng, whose king fled to Kangju. Yucheng then surrendered. Li returned with only 10,000 men.

In 101 BC, the Xiongnu raided Dingxiang, Yunzhong, Zhangye, and Jiuquan.

In the summer of 99 BC, Li Guangli and three other generals led a force of 35,000 against the Xiongnu in the Tian Shan range. Initially successful, Li Guangli killed some 10,000 Xiongnu, but was surrounded and had to fortify. They sortied out and managed to drive back the Xiongnu before making a run for it. The Xiongnu gave chase and dealt heavy casualties on the Han army. Li Guangli only returned with 40% of his forces. Li Ling and Lu Bode had been left further back earlier as a rear guard, but Lu Bode objected to serving under Li Ling and left. Li Ling decided to advance by himself with only 5,000 infantry, confident that his force of crossbowmen would be able to handle any force they encountered. He was confronted with a force of 30,000 Xiongnu and had to fortify behind a wagon laager between two hills. The Xiongnu made repeated charges on his position, but failed to overcome Li Ling's crossbow and shield/spear formation, suffering heavy casualties. When Li Ling's forces made a break for it, the Xiongnu chased after them, harassing them until nightfall. Only 400 men made it back and Li Ling was himself captured.

In the summer of 94 BC, Xu Xiangru led a force of auxiliaries from the Western Regions against Suoju (Yarkant County) and killed their king, capturing 1,500 people.

In the spring of 90 BC, Li Guangli and two other generals led a force of 79,000 against the Xiongnu. Initially successful, Li overextended and his supplies ran out, exhausting his men and horses. The Xiongnu outpaced them and dug ditches across their line of retreat. When they tried to cross the ditches, the Xiongnu fell on them, routing the entire army. Li Guangli surrendered. The other generals Shang Qiucheng and Ma Tong managed to return safely. Cheng Wan attacked Jushi Kingdom with a force of 35,000 and secured their king's surrender.

In 87 BC, Wen Zhong subjugated a city near modern Islamabad.

In 83 BC, Han relinquished control over Lintun Commandery and Zhenfan Commandery.

In 78 BC, Fan Mingyou led 20,000 soldiers to aid the Wuhuan against the Xiongnu, but they arrived too late, and attacked the Wuhuan instead.

In 75 BC, Goguryeo took some territory from Xuantu Commandery.

In 71 BC, Chang Hui and two other generals led a force of 100,000 to aid the Wusun against the Xiongnu. The majority of the forces failed to find any Xiongnu, but Chang Hui successfully aided the Wusun in defeating a Xiongnu invasion. However the Xiongnu came back in winter and took many captives. On the way back across the Altai Mountains, the Xiongnu suffered heavy casualties from a sudden blizzard, devastating their army. The next year the Xiongnu were attacked on all sides by Wusun, Wuhuan, and the Han. One third of all Xiongnu died.

In 68 BC, Chang Hui led 45,000 auxiliaries from the Western Regions against Qiuci, which surrendered. Zheng Ji also subdued the Jushi Kingdom, its king having fled to the Wusun.

In 65 BC, the Qiang revolted in eastern Tibet and Suoju rebelled as well. Feng Fengshi was sent in with 15,000 men and subdued Suoju.

In 64 BC, the Xiongnu raided Jiaohe.

In 61 BC, Zhao Chongguo advanced into eastern Tibet and set up colonies near Qinghai Lake. He also advocated for reduction of cavalry forces to reduce military expenditure.

=== Western protectorate ===
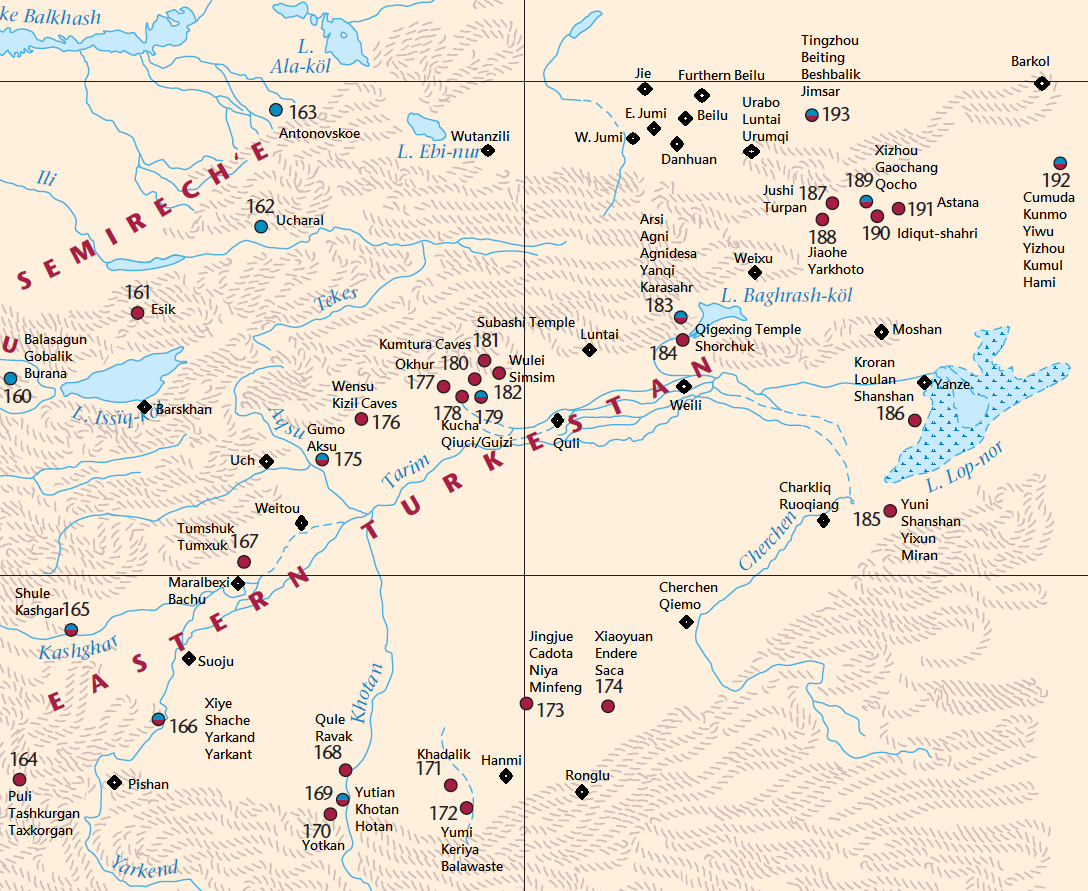
Historical cities of the Tarim Basin

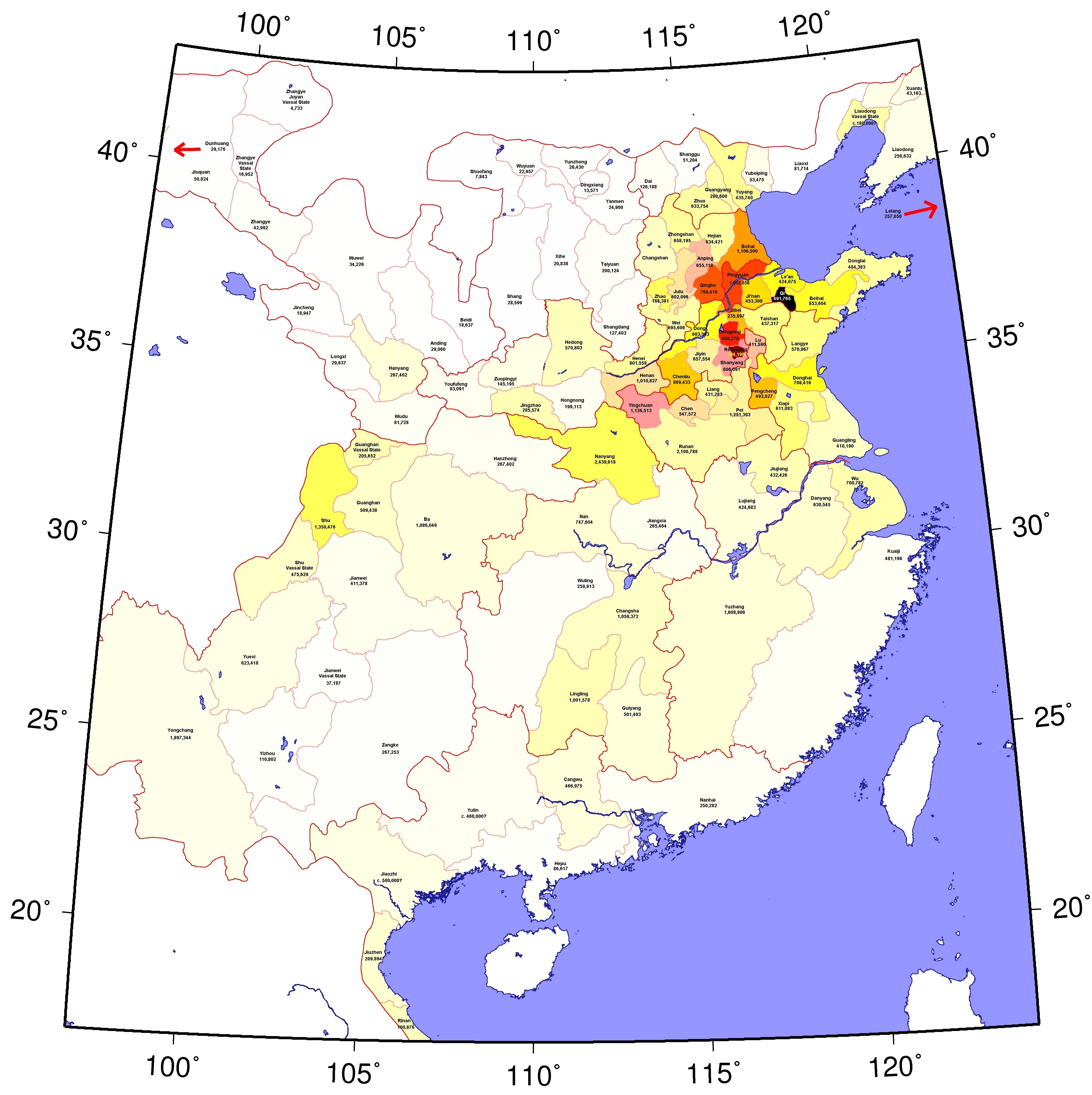
Population of the Han dynasty in 2 AD

In 60 BC, Xianxianchan, the Rizhu King of Jushi Kingdom, surrendered to Zheng Ji. The Protectorate of the Western Regions was created and the Han gained hegemony over the western oasis states.

In 58 BC, Woyanqudi Chanyu died and the Xiongnu split up into five warring factions.

In 55 BC, the Xiongnu coalesced into two groups, one under Zhizhi Chanyu and the other under his brother Huhanye.

In 51 BC, Huhanye was defeated by Zhizhi Chanyu and fled to the Han.

In 50 BC, Zhizhi Chanyu nominally submitted to the Han.

In 48 BC, Zhizhi Chanyu declared independence after seeing the Han favor his brother Huhanye. He attacked the Wusun and based his operations in Zungaria.

In 43 BC, Huhanye moved back to the north, starting the era of Western and Eastern Xiongnu.

In 42 BC, the Qiang rebelled and defeated a force of 12,000 under Feng Fengshi.

In 41 BC, Feng Fengshi returned to eastern Tibet with 60,000 men and crushed the Qiang rebellion.

In 36 BC, Gan Yanshou and Chen Tang led a force of 40,000 against the Xiongnu led by Zhizhi Chanyu, who had built a fortress capital in Kangju (around modern Taraz). Gan Yanshou, Imperial Han Protector of the Western Regions, did not care about Zhizhi, but his subordinate commander, Chen Tang, forged an imperial edict to mobilize some 40,000 troops against the Chanyu. They reached Wusun territory and then advanced on Kangju. Several thousand Kangju attacked them as they were settling in and took their supplies. When the Kangju attacked again, the Han army was ready, driving them off with crossbows, killing 400 Kangju soldiers, and recovering their supplies. Some 400 Wusun slaves, a large contingent of Sogdians, and Kangju nobles sick of the Xiongnu joined the Han army. Upon reaching Zhizhi's fortress, the army started constructing a fortified camp, but the Xiongnu sallied out with several hundred armoured cavalry and a supporting infantry force in a formation that looked like fish scales. The Xiongnu forces were defeated by Han crossbowmen and fled back into the fort. That night the Xiongnu tried to escape and in the process lost many men to the besieging crossbowmen. The next day, the Han forces tried to take the fortress by a frontal attack under cover of shields and crossbowmen but failed to burn the gate and were forced retreated. Chen then decided to fully encircle the city with a walled palisade. Xiongnu defenders throwing incendiaries and shooting arrows on the fortress walls were swept away by crossbowmen who rained bolts on them until they fled. Zhizhi and the Xiongnu tried to flee again in the night but were intercepted by Sogdian soldiers who alerted the Han army. Zhizhi was forced to turn back and re-enter the fortress. In the morning, Chinese archers shot incendiary arrows into the fort and started large fires. Zhizhi retreated into the inner citadel. A Kangju relief force made several attacks on the Han position at night, delaying the inevitable assault and allowing the defenders to repair their walls. However they failed to prevent the Han army from building a rampart to the top of the walls. When the Han army attacked, the city fell with ease and Zhizhi Chanyu was stabbed to death. His children and concubines were among 1,518 people executed. More than 1,000 were made slaves and 145 men were taken as prisoners. During this battle, an infantry unit on the Kangju side used a formation described as having the appearance of fish scales, which has caused speculation that they were Roman legionnaires captured at Carrhae. Evidence is inconclusive.

In 12 BC, Duan Huizong led a force to Wusun and resolved a dispute.

In 6 AD, a petty king in the area of the former Jushi Kingdom defected to the Xiongnu, who turned him over to the Han.

In 7 AD, the Han convinced the Wuhuan to stop sending tribute to the Xiongnu, who immediately attacked and defeated the Wuhuan.

In 9 AD, Wang Mang proclaimed himself emperor of the Xin dynasty.

In 10 AD, some officers of the Protector General Dan Qin rebelled, slew him, and fled to the Xiongnu.

In 11 AD, Wuzhuliu Chanyu of the Xiongnu attacked Yunzhong, Yanmen, and Shuofang commanderies.

In 16 AD, an army under Li Chong and Guo Qin was sent to subdue Yanqi. One contingent was ambushed and defeated but the other massacred the population of Yanqi. Other regions remained loyal along with Suoju.

=== Eastern Han ===
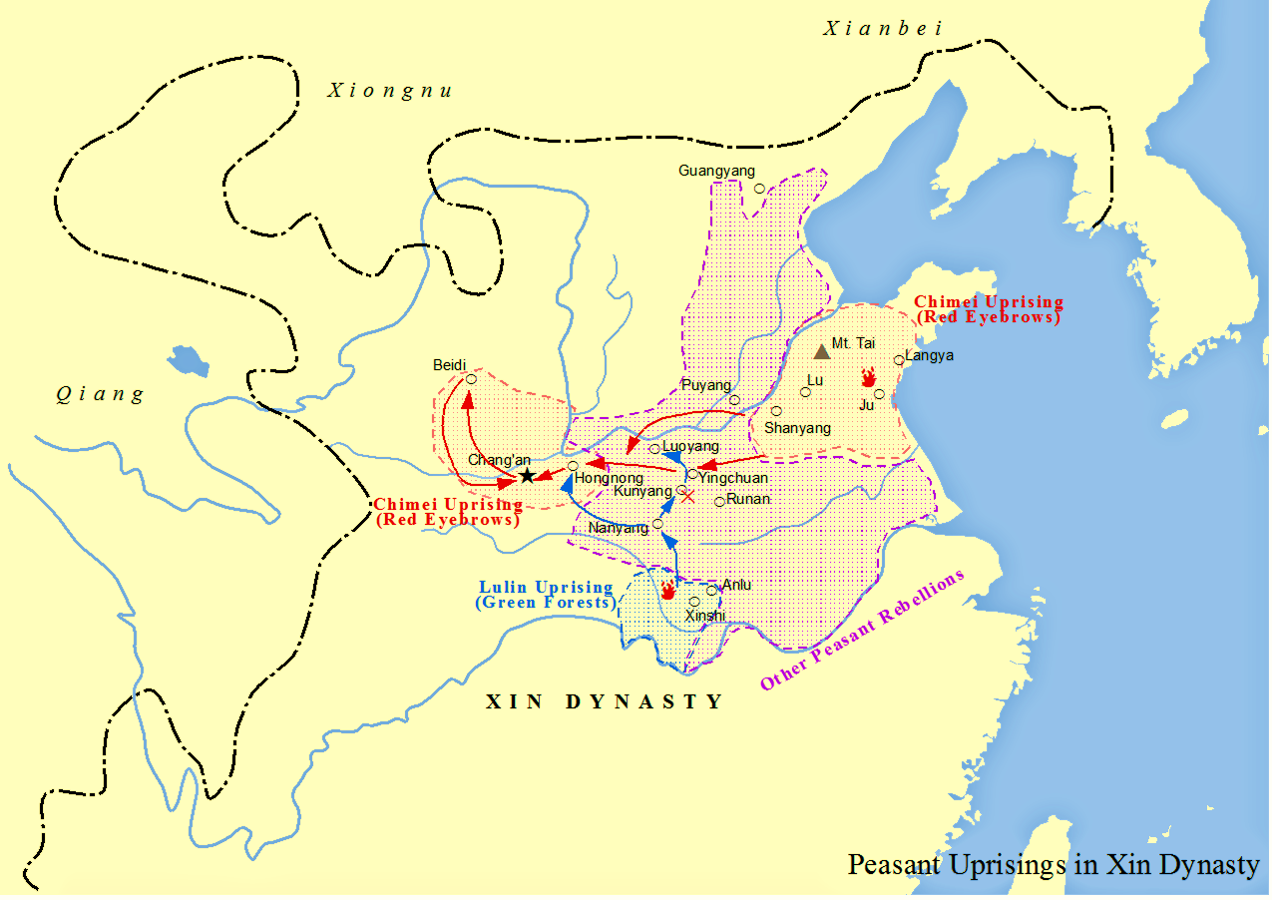
Rebellions at the end of the Xin dynasty (9–23)

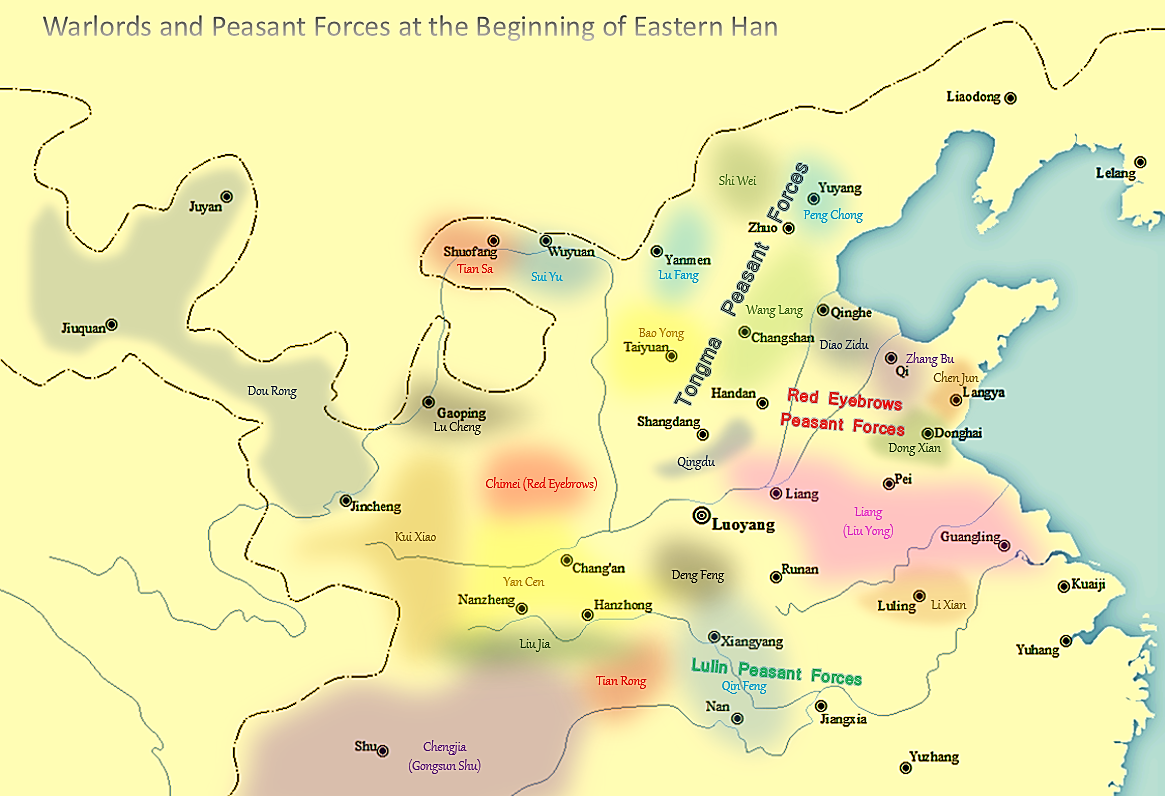
Warlords and rebel forces post-Xin collapse

In 23 AD, Wang Mang's Xin dynasty was defeated and 12 years of civil war ensued. The Protectorate of the Western Regions was left to its own devices. In the absence of the Han, Xian of Suoju became Hegemon King of the Western Regions and was even able to extend its power over Dayuan to the west. In 50 AD, Suoju attacked Dayuan with an army of 10,000 when their king, Yanliu, failed to send tribute. Yanliu was brought back to Suoju while King Qiaositai of Jumi was sent to rule Dayuan. However Qiaositai suffered from repeated attacks by Kangju and abandoned Dayuan. Yanliu was sent back to Dayuan. In 60 AD, Xiumoba of Yutian rebelled against Xian but died in the assault on Suoju. Xiumoba's nephew Guangde captured Suoju in 61 AD. When the Northern Xiongnu learned of this, they attacked Yutian and enthroned Xian's son, Bujuzheng, as king of Suoju. After Dou Gu defeated the Northern Xiongnu in 73 AD, Guangde joined the Han forces in subjugating Suoju. Guangde's brother, Qili, became the new king of Suoju in 87 AD.

In 35 AD, Emperor Guangwu of Han, also known as the "Bronze Horse Emperor," reunited the Han dynasty.

In 40 AD, Jiuzhen, Jiaozhi, and Rinan commanderies rebelled under the Trung sisters.

In 42 AD, the Trung sisters' rebellion was defeated by Ma Yuan.

In 49 AD, the Qiang tribes retook the Qinghai region

In 50 AD, Bi chanyu and the Southern Xiongnu settled in Bing Province.

In 57 AD, the Qiang led by Dianyu raided Jincheng Commandery.

In 59 AD, a Han army defeated Dianyu.

In 62 AD, the Northern Xiongnu made a major raid but was repelled.

In 69 AD, Liumiao the King of the Ailao, submitted to the Han dynasty. His territory was incorporated under eight new counties, extending Han territory into modern Myanmar.

In 73 AD, Dou Gu led a force of 12,000 against the Xiongnu and defeated Huyan in modern northeastern Xinjiang.

In 74 AD, Dou Gu led another expedition to the Western Regions and gained the submission of Jushi, restoring the Protectorate of the Western Regions.

In 75 AD, the Xiongnu besieged Jushi and Chen Mu was killed by the locals.

In 76 AD, Lei'ao the King of the Ailao, gathered 3,000 men and attacked the headquarters of Yongchang Commandery and drove out Han administration. Nine thousand Han militia and non-Chinese auxiliaries were called up from surrounding commanderies and defeated him in the following year. His head was sent to Luoyang.

In 77 AD, the Protectorate of the Western Regions was abandoned again.

In 78 AD, Ban Chao defeated Gumo, which was aided by Kangju.

In 84 AD, Ban Chao brought forces against Shule, but could not defeat them due to reinforcements from their ally, Kangju. Ban Chao sent gifts to the Kushan Empire and they influenced the Kangju troops to retreat. The king of Suoju went with them.

In 87 AD, Ban Chao attacked Suoju with 25,000 men. They were heavily outnumbered due to 50,000 reinforcements from Suoju's ally, Qiuci, but Ban Chao made a false retreat and deceived the army of Qiuci into giving chase. Ban Chao then rounded back and made a surprise attack on the Suoju camp, defeating them. The army of Qiuci withdrew.

In the summer of 89 AD, Dou Xian led an army of around 45,000 against the Northern Xiongnu and defeated them. This marked the effective end of Xiongnu power in the steppes and the rise of the less organized but more aggressive Xianbei.

The ideal situation on the frontier was to have a non-Chinese ruler so powerful within his own lands that his orders were obeyed but so dependent on Chinese goodwill, or vulnerable to Chinese threats, that he kept his people from troubling imperial territory. By destroying the Northern Shanyu, the Han removed a potential client and found itself faced with the incoherent but spreading power of the Xianbi, while the Southern regime was overwhelmed by its new responsibilities. So the empire destroyed a weak and all but suppliant enemy for the benefit of a junior ally who could not make good use of the victory, to the ultimate profit of a far more dangerous enemy.

— Rafe de Crespigny

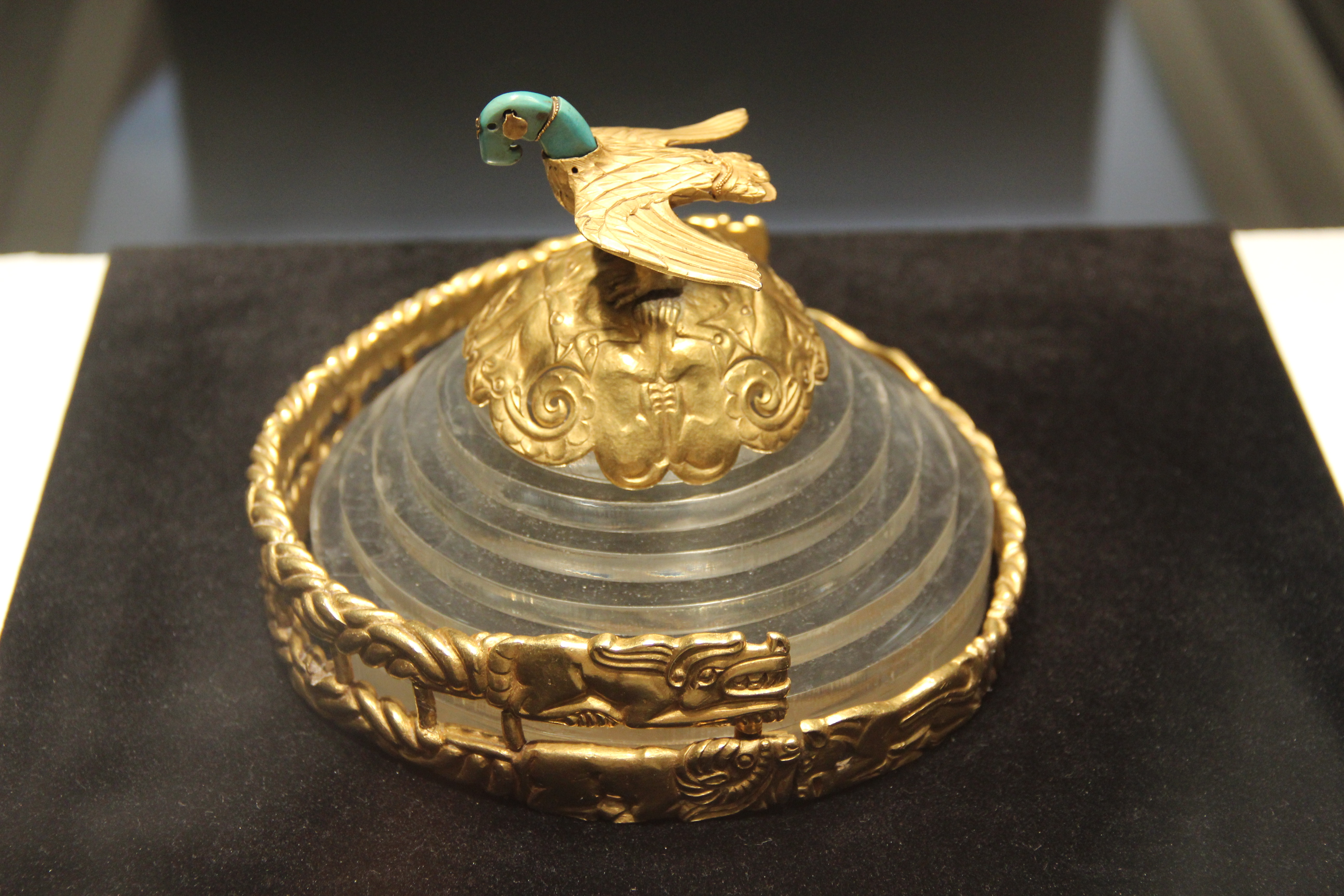
Xiongnu crown, Warring States period

In 90 AD, the Protectorate of the Western Regions was restored under Ban Chao. Qiuci, Gumo, and Wensu submitted to the Han. The Kushan Empire sent the general known as Xie with an army of 70,000 against Ban Chao in Shule. Ban Chao fled and implemented a scorched earth policy which left the Kushan army with no supplies. Xie sought to purchase supplies at Qiuci, but Ban Chao anticipated this, and laid an ambush for the Kushan messengers, killing them. Realizing that they could advance no further, Xie retreated.

In 96 AD, Han forces attacked the Xiongnu king Wujuzhan and killed him.

In 107 AD, Dianlian of the Qiang Xianlian attacked Liang Province. As a result, the Protectorate of the Western Regions was abandoned. The Han court sent Deng Zhi and Ren Shang against the invading army, and although the Qiang forces suffered significant casualties, they were defeated at Hanyang Commandery. Having achieved victory against the Han army, Dianlian proclaimed himself emperor at Beidi Commandery. Qiang forces now threatened Han territory as far south as Hanzhong Commandery and as far east as Ji Province.

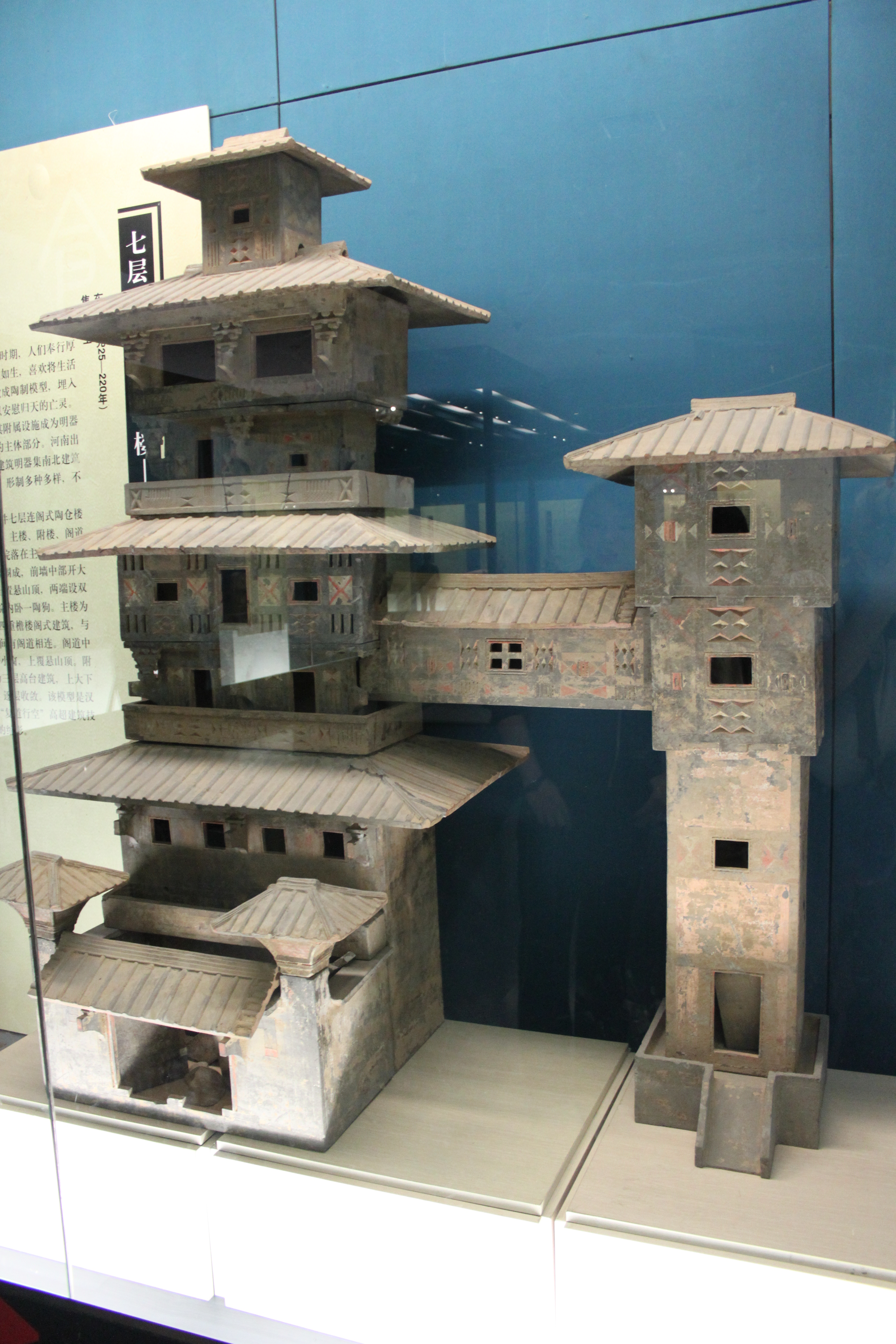
Han dynasty pottery watchtower model

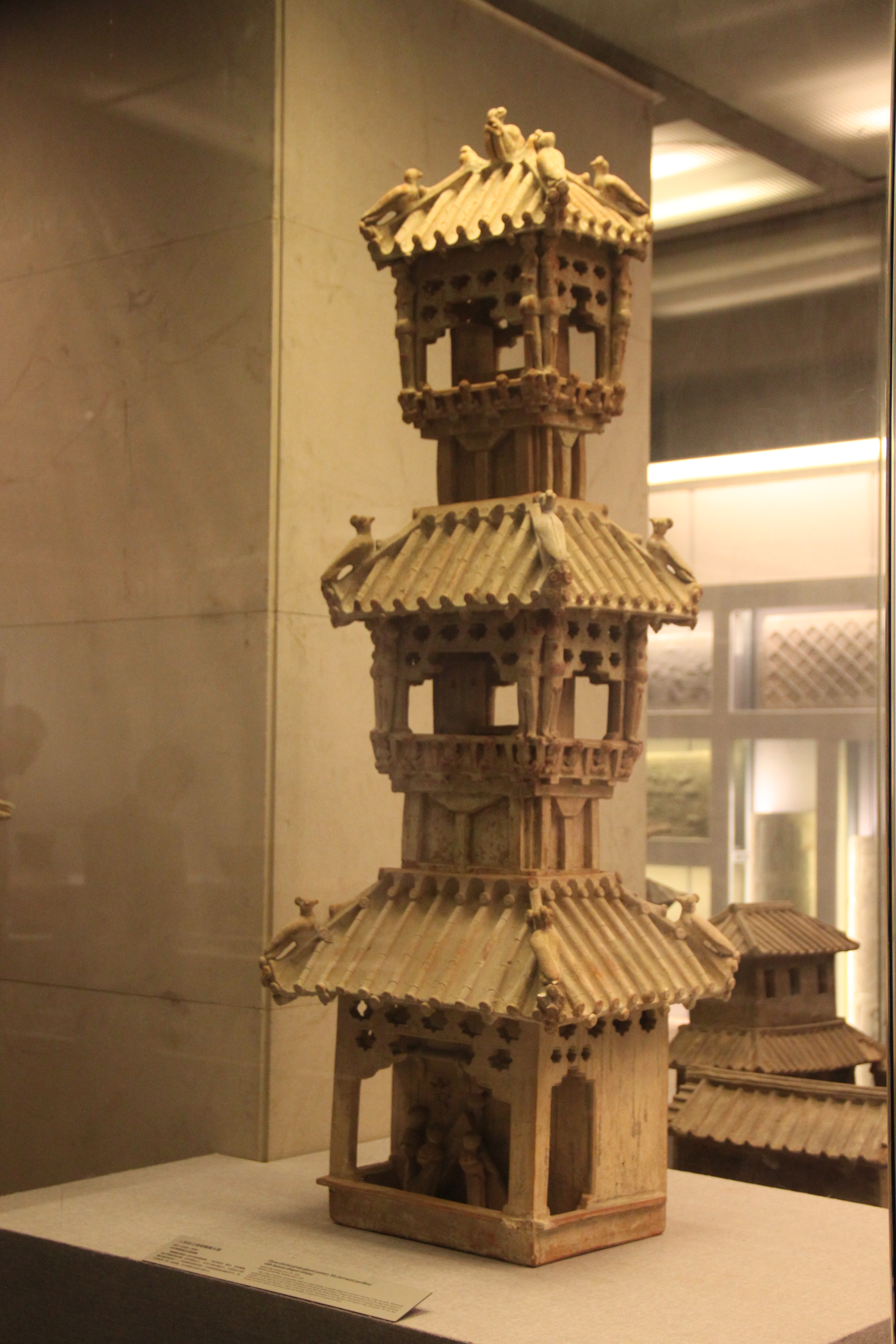
Han dynasty watchtower

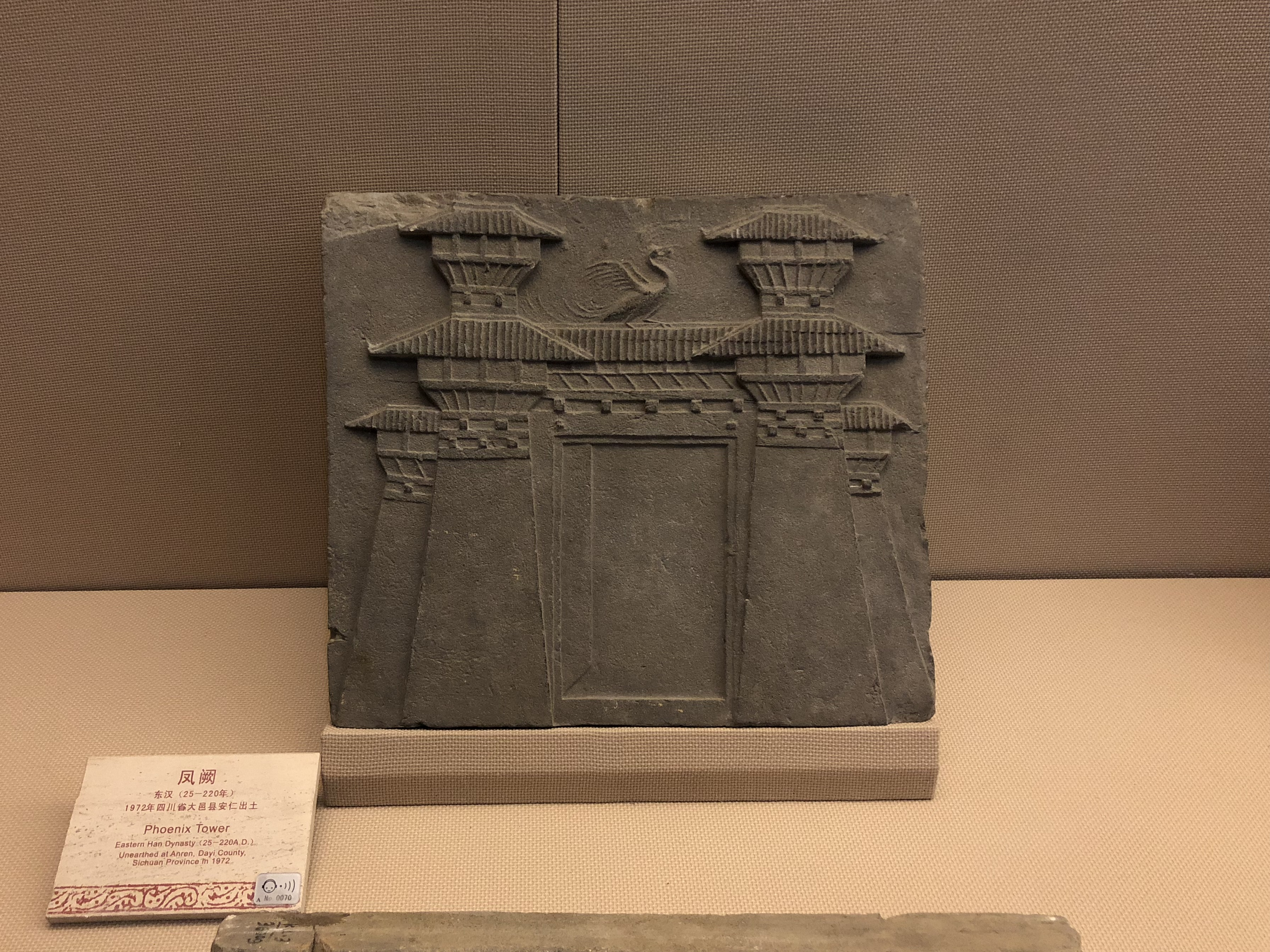
Han dynasty gate towers

In 109 AD, Dianlian conquered Longxi Commandery. The Wuhuan and Xianbei attacked Wuyuan Commandery and defeated local Han forces. The Southern Xiongnu chanyu Wanshishizhudi rebelled against the Han and attacked the Emissary Geng Chong but failed to oust him. Han forces under Geng Kui retaliated and defeated a force of 3,000 Xiongnu but could not take the Southern Xiongnu capital due to disease among the horses of their Xianbei allies.

In 110 AD, Dianlian defeated and killed the Administrator Zheng Qin in Hanzhong Commandery. The Southern Xiongnu raided Changshan Commandery and Zhongshan Commandery. The Wanshi Chanyu engaged in battle with a Han army of 8,000 under Liang Qin. The Xiongnu surrounded the Han army, but Liang Qin broke through the encirclement, killing 3,000 and defeating the Xiongnu forces. The Wanshi Chanyu surrendered and was given amnesty.

In 112 AD, Dianlian died and was succeeded by his son Lianchang. Lianchang was too young to exercise authority and another man of the tribe, Langmo, took charge of strategy. The new regime was significantly less effective under the regent and failed to make any headway against Han forces.

In 116 AD, the Han general Deng Zun led 10,000 Southern Xiongnu cavalry in a raid on Lianchang's headquarters from the north. Meanwhile, Ren Shang attacked from the south and killed Lianchang's wife and children. Hill peoples under Chentang and Yangsun led a rebellion in Wuling Commandery but were quickly put down by local tribal auxiliaries.

In 117 AD, Lianchang was assassinated and forces under Ren Shang ended Qiang raids.

In 120 AD, the Qiang chieftain Jiwu attacked Jincheng Commandery and was defeated by the general Ma Xian.

In 121 AD, the Xianbei under Qizhijian raided Han territory. The Qiang Shaodang tribe under Manu raided Wuwei Commandery but were defeated by the general Ma Xian the following year. Go Suseong of Goguryeo attacked Xuantu Commandery but was defeated by a combined Han-Buyeo army.

In 126 AD, Ban Yong invaded the Western Regions and conquered Yanqi. Qiuci, Yutian, and Suoju submitted to Han. The Protectorate of the Western Regions was however not re-established and only a chief clerk was appointed to deal with the western states. The Han attempted to colonize Yiwu several times in the following decades but these efforts were cut short in 157 AD by other disturbances to the far south. Official administration over the Western Regions was not re-established by another Chinese state until the Tang dynasty in the 7th century AD. Qizhijian of the Xianbei attacked Dai Commandery and killed the Administrator Li Chao.

In 127 AD, the Xianbei raided Liaodong Commandery and Xuantu Commandery.

In 128 AD, the Xianbei attacked Yuyang Commandery.

In 136 AD, people known as the Qulian from beyond the southern frontier attacked Rinan Commandery, causing turmoil and confusion.

In 137 AD, a rebellion occurred in Rinan Commandery and was peacefully quelled without resorting to arms.

In 140 AD, the Qiang rebelled. Wusi and Cheniu of the Southern Xiongnu rebelled.

In 141 AD, Wusi and Cheniu were defeated. Cheniu surrendered while Wusi was killed by his followers in 143.

In 142 AD, the Qiang rebellion was put down.

In 144 AD, a rebellion occurred in Rinan Commandery and was peacefully quelled without resorting to arms.

In 145 AD, the Xianbei raided Dai Commandery.

In 157 AD, a rebellion occurred in Jiuzhen Commandery and was defeated.

In 166 AD, the Xianbei started conducting annual raids.

In 167 AD, Duan Jiong conducted an anti-Qiang campaign and massacred Qiang populations as well as settled them outside the frontier.

In 169 AD, Geng Lin attacked Goguryeo forced the king to offer submission.

In 168 AD, the Xianbei under Tanshihuai raided Han territory.

In 177 AD, Xia Yu, Tian Yan and the Tute Chanyu led a force of 30,000 against the Xianbei. They were defeated and returned with only a quarter of their original forces.

In 178 AD, Liang Long rebelled in the south.

In 181 AD, Zhu Juan defeated Liang Long's rebellion.

In 182 AD, the Xianbei khan Tanshihuai died and his weak successor Helian failed to keep the confederacy intact.

In 184 AD, the Yellow Turban Rebellion and Liang Province rebellion erupted, leading to the fragmentation and downfall of the Han dynasty.

== Full list of military campaigns ==
=== Han–Xiongnu War ===
Han-Xiongnu War
Year	Aggressor	Forces	Commander	Title	Place of departure	Result
200 BC; Battle of Baideng	Han	320,000	Emperor Gaozu of Han			Besieged for four days until the emperor's wife bribed the Xiongnu to go away
197 BC	Xiongnu					Raided Dai Commandery
196 BC	Xiongnu					Raided Dai Commandery (Canhe)
195 BC	Xiongnu					Raided Shanggu and eastward
182 BC	Xiongnu					Raided Longxi Commandery (Didao) and Tianshui (Ayang)
181 BC	Xiongnu					Raided Longxi Commandery (Didao) and abducted 2,000 people
179 BC	Xiongnu					Raided Yunzhong Commandery and plundered tribes loyal to Han
177 BC	Xiongnu					Conducted massacre at He'nan and Shang
169 BC	Xiongnu					
166 BC	Xiongnu	140,000				Raided Anding (Chaona and Xiaoguan), Beidi, Anding (Pengyang), and Liang (Ganjuan Palace); Burned Huizhong Palace
158 BC	Xiongnu	30,000				Raided Shang, Yunzhong Commandery, and Dai Commandery (Gouzhu)
148 BC	Xiongnu					Raided Yan Province
144 BC	Xiongnu					Stole horses from Yanmen Commandery, Yunzhong Commandery (Wuchuan), and Shang
142 BC	Xiongnu					Attacked Yanmen Commandery and killed Governor Feng Jing
133 BC (Summer); Battle of Mayi	Han	300,000	Wang Hui; Han Anguo; Gongsun He; Li Guang; Li Zi			Failed to ambush Xiongnu; Wang Hui committed suicide
129 BC (Spring)	Han	40,000	Wei Qing	General of chariot and cavalry	Shanggu	Victory: Killed several thousand Xiongnu; Captured 700 Xiongnu
129 BC (Spring)	Han	40,000	Gongsun Ao	Cavalry general	Dai	Defeated: 700 men lost
129 BC (Spring)	Han	40,000	Gongsun He	General of light chariot	Yunzhong	Failed to find Xiongnu
129 BC (Spring)	Han	40,000	Li Guang	General of resolute cavalry	Yanmen	Captured by Xiongnu, but escaped and returned
129 BC (Winter)	Xiongnu					Raided Shanggu, Yuyang, and killed the governor of Liaoxi
128 BC (Autumn)	Han	40,000	Wei Qing	General of chariot and cavalry	Dai	Victory
128 BC (Autumn)	Han	40,000	Li Xi	General	Dai	
127 BC	Xiongnu					Raided Liaoxi and killed its governor Raided Yanmen and carried off several thousand men Defeated Han Anguo
127 BC (Spring)	Han		Wei Qing	General of chariot and cavalry	Yunzhong	Killed 2,300 Xiongnu at Gaoque (Shuofang); Captured 3,075 Xiongnu and one million livestock at Fuli (Wuyuan)
127 BC (Spring)	Han		Hao Xian	Governor of Shanggu	Yunzhong	
127 BC (Spring)	Han		Li Xi	General	Dai	
126 BC	Xiongnu	90,000	Wise king (Dugi) of the right			Raided Dai Commandery, Dingxiang, and Shang, taking several thousand slaves Killed the grand administrator of Dai Commandery, Gong You
124 BC (Spring)	Han	100,000 (mostly light cavalry)	Wei Qing	General of chariot and cavalry	Shuofang (Gaoque)	Captured ten petty chieftains, 15,000 Xiongnu, and one million livestock
124 BC (Spring)	Han	100,000 (mostly light cavalry)	Hao Xian			
124 BC (Spring)	Han	100,000 (mostly light cavalry)	Li Suo	Colonel		
124 BC (Spring)	Han	100,000 (mostly light cavalry)	Zhao Buyu	Colonel		
124 BC (Spring)	Han	100,000 (mostly light cavalry)	Gongsun Rongnu	Colonel		
124 BC (Spring)	Han	100,000 (mostly light cavalry)	Dou Yiru	Colonel		
124 BC (Spring)	Han	100,000 (mostly light cavalry)	Li Xi	General	Yubeiping	
124 BC (Spring)	Han	100,000 (mostly light cavalry)	Zhang Cigong	General	Yubeiping	
124 BC (Spring)	Han	100,000 (mostly light cavalry)	Gongsun He	Cavalry general	Shuofang	
124 BC (Spring)	Han	100,000 (mostly light cavalry)	Su Jian	Scouting and attacking general	Shuofang	
124 BC (Spring)	Han	100,000 (mostly light cavalry)	Li Cai	General of light chariots	Shuofang	
124 BC (Spring)	Han	100,000 (mostly light cavalry)	Li Ju	General of crossbowmen	Shuofang	
124 BC (Spring)	Han	100,000 (mostly light cavalry)	Han Yue	Chief commander		
123 BC (Spring)	Han	100,000 cavalry	Wei Qing	General in chief	Dingxiang	Killed over 3,000 Xiongnu north of Dingxiang
123 BC (Spring)	Han	100,000 cavalry	Hao Xian	Governor of Shanggu		
123 BC (Spring)	Han	100,000 cavalry	Huo Qubing	Swift colonel		Killed and captured 2,228 Xiongnu
123 BC (Spring)	Han	100,000 cavalry	Gongsun Ao	General of the center		
123 BC (Spring)	Han	100,000 cavalry	Gongsun He	General of the left		
123 BC (Spring)	Han	100,000 cavalry	Zhao Xin	General of the vanguard		Defeated and surrendered to Xiongnu
123 BC (Spring)	Han	100,000 cavalry	Su Jian	General of the right		Defeated and escaped alone 3,000 Han soldiers killed
123 BC (Spring)	Han	100,000 cavalry	Li Guang	General of the rear		
123 BC (Spring)	Han	100,000 cavalry	Li Ju	General of crossbowmen		
122 BC	Xiongnu	10,000				Raided Shanggu
121 BC (Spring)	Han	10,000 cavalry	Huo Qubing	General of swift cavalry	Longxi	Killed and captured 8,960 Xiongnu west of the Yanzhi Mountains (in modern Gansu)
121 BC (Spring)	Han	10,000 cavalry	Zhao Ponu	Hawklike attacking marshal		
121 BC (Summer)	Han	20,000+ cavalry	Huo Qubing	Hawklike attacking marshal	Beidi	Killed and captured 33,000 Xiongnu south of Jiuquan
121 BC (Summer)	Han	20,000+ cavalry	Zhao Ponu	Hawklike attacking marshal		
121 BC (Summer)	Han	20,000+ cavalry	Gao Bushi	Colonel		Captured 1,768 Xiongnu
121 BC (Summer)	Han	20,000+ cavalry	Pu Peng	Colonel		Captured five Xiongnu kings
121 BC (Summer)	Han	20,000+ cavalry	Gongsun Ao	Marquis of Heqi	Beidi	Got lost and failed to make contact with Huo
121 BC (Summer)	Han	24,000 cavalry	Zhang Qian	Commander of the Palace Guard	Yubeiping	Was late
121 BC (Summer)	Han	4,000 cavalry	Li Guang	Chief of palace attendants	Yubeiping	Killed 3,000 Xiongnu bu lost nearly his entire force and escaped alone
120 BC	Xiongnu					Raided Youbeiping and Xingxiang, carrying off 1,000 captives
119 BC (Summer); Battle of Mobei	Han	50,000 cavalry 140,000 volunteer cavalry 200,000+ infantry	Wei Qing	Supreme commander	Dingxiang	Killed 19,000 Xiongnu; Seized the fort of Zhaoxin
119 BC (Summer); Battle of Mobei	Han	50,000 cavalry 140,000 volunteer cavalry 200,000+ infantry	Guo Chang	Colonel		
119 BC (Summer); Battle of Mobei	Han	50,000 cavalry 140,000 volunteer cavalry 200,000+ infantry	Xun Zhi			
119 BC (Summer); Battle of Mobei	Han	50,000 cavalry 140,000 volunteer cavalry 200,000+ infantry	Chang Hui	Governor of Xihe		
119 BC (Summer); Battle of Mobei	Han	50,000 cavalry 140,000 volunteer cavalry 200,000+ infantry	Sui Cheng	Governor of Yunzhong		
119 BC (Summer); Battle of Mobei	Han	50,000 cavalry 140,000 volunteer cavalry 200,000+ infantry	Li Guang	General of the vanguard		Late at rendezvous and committed suicide
119 BC (Summer); Battle of Mobei	Han	50,000 cavalry 140,000 volunteer cavalry 200,000+ infantry	Zhao Yiji	General of the right		Late at rendezvous
119 BC (Summer); Battle of Mobei	Han	50,000 cavalry 140,000 volunteer cavalry 200,000+ infantry	Gongsun Ao	General of the center		
119 BC (Summer); Battle of Mobei	Han	50,000 cavalry 140,000 volunteer cavalry 200,000+ infantry	Cao Xiang	General of the rear		
119 BC (Summer); Battle of Mobei	Han	50,000 cavalry 140,000 volunteer cavalry 200,000+ infantry	Gongsun He	General of the left		
119 BC (Summer); Battle of Mobei	Han	50,000 cavalry	Huo Qubing	Supreme commander	Dai, Yubeiping	
119 BC (Summer); Battle of Mobei	Han	50,000 cavalry	Li Gan	Colonel		
119 BC (Summer); Battle of Mobei	Han	50,000 cavalry	Xu Ziwei	Colonel		Killed and captured 12,700 Xiongnu
119 BC (Summer); Battle of Mobei	Han	50,000 cavalry	Lu Bode	Governor of Yubeiping		
119 BC (Summer); Battle of Mobei	Han	50,000 cavalry	Wei Shan	Chief commander of Bodi		Captured a Xiongnu king
119 BC (Summer); Battle of Mobei	Han	50,000 cavalry	Zhao Ponu	Congpiao Marquis		
119 BC (Summer); Battle of Mobei	Han	50,000 cavalry	Jie	Governor of Yuyang		
119 BC (Summer); Battle of Mobei	Han	50,000 cavalry	Zhao Anji	Marquis of Changwu		
119 BC (Summer); Battle of Mobei	Han	50,000 cavalry	Fu Luji	Colonel		
119 BC (Summer); Battle of Mobei	Han	50,000 cavalry	Yi Jixian			
116 BC	Xiongnu					Raided Liang Province
111 BC (Autumn)	Han	15,000 cavalry	Gongsun He	General of Fuju	Wuyuan	Failed to find Xiongnu
111 BC (Autumn)	Han	10,000 cavalry	Zhao Ponu	General of Xiong River	Lingju	Failed to find Xiongnu
110 BC (Winter)	Han	180,000 cavalry	Emperor Wu of Han			Failed to find Xiongnu
108 BC	Han	25,000 cavalry	Zhao Ponu			Failed to find Xiongnu
103 BC (Summer)	Han	20,000 cavalry	Zhao Ponu	General of Junji		Killed and captured 2,000+ Xiongnu but got surrounded and surrendered
102 BC	Xiongnu		Wise king (Dugi) of the right			Raided Jiuquan and Zhangye, capturing several thousand people
99 BC (Summer); Battle of Tian Shan	Han	30,000 cavalry	Li Guangli	Ershi General	Shuofang	Killed and captured 10,000 Xiongnu but was surrounded on the way back and most of his forces were killed
99 BC (Summer); Battle of Tian Shan	Han	30,000 cavalry	Gongsun Ao	General of Yinyu	Xihe	
99 BC (Summer); Battle of Tian Shan	Han	30,000 cavalry	Lu Bode	Chief commandant of crossbowmen	Juyan	
99 BC (Summer); Battle of Tian Shan	Han	5,000 infantry/cavalry	Li Ling	Chief commandant of cavalry	Juyan	Killed and captured 10,000 Xiongnu but was defeated and surrendered Only 400 survived
97 BC (Spring)	Han	50,000 cavalry 70,000 infantry	Li Guangli	Ershi General	Shuofang	Defeated
97 BC (Spring)	Han	10,000 infantry	Lu Bode	Chief commandant of crossbowmen	Juyan	
97 BC (Spring)	Han	30,000 infantry	Han Yue	Scouting and attacking general	Wuyuan	
97 BC (Spring)	Han	10,00 cavalry 30,000 infantry	Gongsun Ao	General of Yinyu	Yanmen	Defeated
90 BC (Spring)	Han	9,000 cavalry (with auxiliaries)	Li Guangli	Ershi General	Wuyuan	Surrendered
90 BC (Spring)	Han	30,000 cavalry	Shang Qiucheng	Grand secretary	Xihe	Victory
90 BC (Spring)	Han	40,000 cavalry	Ma Tong	Marquis of Chonghe	Jiuquan	
71 BC	Han	150,000 cavalry 50,000 Wusun	Chang Hui	Special envoy		Captured 39,000 Xiongnu and 650,000 livestock
64 BC	Xiongnu					Attacked Jiaohe and repelled by Han reinforcements
36 BC; Battle of Zhizhi	Han	40,000	Gan Yanshou	Protector general	Western Regions	Victory: Killed Zhizhi Chanyu and 1,518 Xiongnu; Captured 145 Xiongnu
36 BC; Battle of Zhizhi	Han	40,000	Chen Tang	Deputy Colonel	Western Regions	
44	Han		Ma Yuan	General		Defeated
45	Xiongnu					Raided Changshan

=== Northern and Southern Xiongnu ===
Han-Xiongnu War
Year	Aggressor	Forces	Commander	Title	Place of departure	Result
62	Northern Xiongnu					Repelled
73; Battle of Yiwulu	Han	12,000 cavalry	Dou Gu		Jiuquan	Pushed the Northern Xiongnu back to Barkul Nor (Lake Pulei)
74	Han	14,000 cavalry	Dou Gu			Captured Jushi (Turpan)
75	Northern Xiongnu					Evicted the Han from the Western Regions
89; Battle of the Altai Mountains	Han	8,000 cavalry 30,000 Xiongnu cavalry 8,000 Qiang auxiliaries	Dou Xian			Killed 13,000 Northern Xiongnu; 81 Xiongnu tribes (200,000) surrendered Captured Yiwu
96	Han					Killed the Southern Xiongnu king Wujuzhan
109–110	Southern Xiongnu	13,000	Wanshi Chanyu			Raided Changshan Commandery and Zhongshan Commandery but was ultimately defeated by Liang Qin
140–143	Southern Xiongnu	8,000	Wusi and Cheniu			Rebelled against the Southern Xiongnu Xiuli Chanyu and raided Han territory Overran Tiger's Teeth encampment (near Chang'an); Cheniu was defeated by Zhang Dan in Yanmen Commandery and surrendered Wusi was defeated by Ma Xu in Xihe Commandery and was killed by his followers

=== Southern wars ===
Southern wars
Year	Aggressor	Target	Forces	Commander	Result
181 BC	Nanyue	Changsha			
113 BC	Han	Nanyue	2,000	Han Qianqiu	Defeated
112–111 BC (Autumn); Han conquest of Nanyue; Han campaigns against Minyue	Han	Nanyue; Minyue	35,000	Lu Bode; Yang Pu; Han Yue; Wang Wenshu	Captured the capital Panyu and killed their king, Zhao Jiande; The people of Minyue killed their own Zou Yushan; Cangwu submitted
109 BC; Han conquest of Dian	Han	Dian Kingdom; Yelang		Guo Chang; Wei Guang	Annexed Dian, Yelang, and other tribes in Yunnan, establishing Yizhou Commandery
40 AD; Trung sisters' rebellion	Trung sisters	Jiaozhi, Jiuzhen, and Rinan commanderies		Trung sisters	Rebelled
42 AD; Trung sisters' rebellion	Han	Trung sisters	8,000 regulars 12,000 militia	Ma Yuan	Victory
136 AD	Qulian	Han	Several thousand		People known as the Qulian from beyond the southern frontier invaded Rinan Commandery, causing turmoil and rebellion
137 AD	Natives	Han			Peacefully quelled
144 AD	Natives	Han			Peacefully quelled
157 AD	Chu Đạt	Han	2,000	Chu Đạt	Chu Đạt rebelled in Jiuzhen Commandery and was defeated
178 AD	Liang Long	Han		Liang Long	Rebelled in Nanhai, Hepu, Jiuzhen, Jiaozhi, and Rinan commanderies
181 AD	Han	Liang Long		Zhu Jun	Victory

=== Korean wars ===
Korean wars
Year	Aggressor	Forces	Commander	Result
109 BC	Han	50,000	Yang Pu	Defeated
109 BC	Han	7,000	Xun Zhi	Defeated
108 BC (Spring)	Han		Xun Zhi; Yang Pu	Besieged Wanggeom-seong for several months before their officials killed Ugeo of Gojoseon and surrendered Annexed and reorganized into the Four Commanderies of Han
75 BC	Goguryeo			Attacked Xuantu Commandery
12	Goguryeo			Repelled
23	Koreans			Took slaves from Lelang Commandery
106	Goguryeo			Took some territory from Xuantu Commandery
121	Goguryeo		Go Suseong	Attacked Xuantu Commandery but was defeated by a Han-Buyeo army
132	Han			Retook some territory in Xuantu Commandery
149	Goguryeo			Raided Xuantu Commandery
169	Han		Geng Lin	Forced Goguryeo into submission

=== Western regions ===
Han campaigns against the Western Regions
Year	Target	Forces	Commander	Title	Place of departure	Result
108 BC; Battle of Loulan	Loulan Kingdom	700	Zhao Ponu	General of the Xiong River		Subjugated Loulan Kingdom and Jushi Kingdom
104–103 BC (Autumn); War of the Heavenly Horses	Dayuan	6,000 auxiliary cavalry 20,000+ convicted conscripts	Li Guangli	General of Sutrishna		Defeated and very few made it back alive
104–103 BC (Autumn); War of the Heavenly Horses	Dayuan	6,000 auxiliary cavalry 20,000+ convicted conscripts	Zhao Shicheng	Director of martial law		
104–103 BC (Autumn); War of the Heavenly Horses	Dayuan	6,000 auxiliary cavalry 20,000+ convicted conscripts	Wang Hui	Expedition guide		
104–103 BC (Autumn); War of the Heavenly Horses	Dayuan	6,000 auxiliary cavalry 20,000+ convicted conscripts	Li Che	Colonel		
102–101 BC (Autumn-spring); War of the Heavenly Horses	Dayuan	60,000 infantry/cavalry 100,000 oxen 30,000 horses 20,000+ donkeys, mules, and camels	Li Guangli	General of Sutrishna	Dunhuang	Massacred the city of Luntai; Killed the king of Dayuan and captured 3,000 horses Captured a city called Yucheng (Uzgen); Reached Kangju before turning back Only 10,000 men returned (attrition due to casualties and desertions).
102–101 BC (Autumn-spring); War of the Heavenly Horses	Dayuan	60,000 infantry/cavalry 100,000 oxen 30,000 horses 20,000+ donkeys, mules, and camels	Wang Shencheng	Colonel		Killed
102–101 BC (Autumn-spring); War of the Heavenly Horses	Dayuan	60,000 infantry/cavalry 100,000 oxen 30,000 horses 20,000+ donkeys, mules, and camels	Zhao Shicheng	Colonel		
102–101 BC (Autumn-spring); War of the Heavenly Horses	Dayuan	60,000 infantry/cavalry 100,000 oxen 30,000 horses 20,000+ donkeys, mules, and camels	Li Che	Colonel		
102–101 BC (Autumn-spring); War of the Heavenly Horses	Dayuan	60,000 infantry/cavalry 100,000 oxen 30,000 horses 20,000+ donkeys, mules, and camels	Shangguan Jie	Chief commandant of foraging		
102–101 BC (Autumn-spring); War of the Heavenly Horses	Dayuan	60,000 infantry/cavalry 100,000 oxen 30,000 horses 20,000+ donkeys, mules, and camels	Hu Chongge	Former grand herald		
94 BC (Summer)	Suoju (around modern Yarkant County)	Auxiliaries from the Western Regions	Xu Xiangru	Imperial inspector		Killed King Fuluo of Suoju and captured 1,500 people
90 BC	Jushi Kingdom	5,000 Han soldiers 30,000 auxiliaries from the states of the Western Regions	Cheng Wan	Marquis of Kailing		Subjugated Jushi Kingdom and captured its king Marks formal presence of the Han in the Western Regions
87 BC	A city near modern Islamabad		Wen Zhong	Chief commandant		Subjugated a city near modern Islamabad
69 BC	Qiuci	47,500 auxiliaries from the Western Regions	Chang Hui			Qiuci submitted to Han suzerainty
68–67 BC; Battle of Jushi	Jushi Kingdom	1,500 conscripted convicts	Zheng Ji	Gentleman in attendance	Quli	Attacked Jushi Kingdom twice, succeeded the second time and started colonizing the area while the king fled to Wusun
68–67 BC; Battle of Jushi	Jushi Kingdom	1,500 conscripted convicts	Sima Xi	Colonel	Quli	
65 BC	Suoju (near modern Yarkant County)	15,000 auxiliaries from the Western Regions	Feng Fengshi	Marquis of Wei	Yixun	Forced the king of Suoju to commit suicide and enthroned another king
16	Yanqi		Guo Qin			The city is massacred
78	Gumo		Ban Chao			Conquered
84	Shule		Ban Chao			Conquered
87	Suoju (near modern Yarkant County)	25,000	Ban Chao			Conquered
90	Han dynasty		Xie (Kushan Empire)			Repelled by Ban Chao

=== Qiang ===
Qiang wars
Year	Aggressor	Forces	Commander	Place of departure	Result
112 BC	Han	20,000 cavalry			Attacked Qiang in eastern Tibet
65 BC	Qiang				Revolted in eastern Tibet
61 BC	Han		Zhao Chongguo		Advanced into eastern Tibet and established colonies near Qinghai Lake
42 BC	Qiang				Revolted and defeated a force of 12,000 under Feng Fengshi
41 BC	Han	60,000	Feng Fengshi		Crushed the Qiang rebellion in eastern Tibet
49	Qiang				Retook modern Qinghai
57	Qiang		Dianyu		Raided Jincheng Commandery
59	Han				Defeated Dianyu
107–112	Qiang		Dianlian		Conquered significant territory in the north
117	Han		Ren Shang		Defeated the Qiang invasion
121	Qiang		Manu		Raided Wuwei Commandery
140	Qiang				Rebellion
142	Han				Put down rebellion
167–168	Han		Duan Jiong	Anding	Massacre of Qiang

=== Wuhuan ===
Wuhuan wars
Year	Aggressor	Forces	Commander	Place of departure	Result
78 BC	Han	20,000	Fan Mingyou		Originally sent to aid the Wuhuan against the Xiongnu, they were too late, and attacked the Wuhuan instead
109	Wuhuan				Defeated Han forces in Wuyuan Commandery

=== Xianbei ===
Xianbei wars
Year	Aggressor	Area invaded	Commander	Forces	Result
109	Xianbei	Wuyuan Commandery			Defeated local Han forces
121	Xianbei		Qizhijian		
126	Xianbei	Dai Commandery	Qizhijian		Killed Administrator Li Chao
127	Xianbei	Liaodong Commandery and Xuantu Commandery			
128	Xianbei	Yuyang Commandery			
145	Xianbei	Dai Commandery			
166	Xianbei				
168	Xianbei		Tanshihuai		
177	Han		Xia Yu; Tian Yan	30,000	Defeated

=== Rebellions ===
- Rebellion of the Seven States
- Red Eyebrows
- Lulin
- Yellow Turban Rebellion
- Liang Province rebellion

== Notable military leaders ==
=== Western Han ===
- Han Xin
- Emperor Gaozu of Han
- Wei Qing
- Li Guangli
- Li Guang
- Huo Qubing
- Gongsun Ao
- Li Ling

=== Eastern Han ===
- Ban Chao
- Cao Cao
- Dou Gu
- Dou Xian

== See also ==
- Economy of the Han dynasty
- Government of the Han dynasty
- History of the Han dynasty
- Science and technology of the Han dynasty
- Society and culture of the Han dynasty
- Timeline of the Han dynasty

== Bibliography ==
- Andrade, Tonio (2016), The Gunpowder Age: China, Military Innovation, and the Rise of the West in World History, Princeton University Press, ISBN 978-0-691-13597-7
- Bielenstein, Hans (1980), The Bureaucracy of Han Times, Cambridge University Press
- Chang, Chun-shu (2007), The Rise of the Chinese Empire 1, The University of Michigan Press
- Cosmo, Nicola Di (2002), Ancient China and Its Enemies, Cambridge University Press
- Cosmo, Nicola di (2009), Military Culture in Imperial China, Harvard University Press
- Coyet, Frederic (1975), Neglected Formosa: a translation from the Dutch of Frederic Coyett's Verwaerloosde Formosa
- Crespigny, Rafe de (2007), A Biographical Dictionary of Later Han to the Three Kingdoms, Brill
- Crespigny, Rafe de (2010), Imperial Warlord, Brill
- Crespigny, Rafe de (2017), Fire Over Luoyang: A History of the Later Han Dynasty, 23–220 AD, Brill
- Gat, Azar (2006), War in Human Civilization, Oxford University Press
- Graff, David A. (2002), Medieval Chinese Warfare, 300–900, Routledge
- Graff, David A. (2016), The Eurasian Way of War: Military practice in seventh-century China and Byzantium, Routledge
- David A. Graff; Robin Higham; Edward L. Dreyer; David C. Wright; Peter Lorge; Ralph D. Sawyer; Paul Lococo Jr.; Miles Yu; Edward A. McCord; Chang Jui-te; William Wei; Larry M. Wortzel; June Teufel Dreyer (2012). A Military History of China. University Press of Kentucky. ISBN 978-0813140674.
- Han, Fei (2003), Han Feizi: Basic Writings, Columbia University Press
- Jackson, Peter (2005), The Mongols and the West, Pearson Education Limited
- Kurz, Johannes L. (2011), China's Southern Tang Dynasty, 937–976, Routledge
- Lewis, Mark Edward (2007), The Early Chinese Empires: Qin and Han, The Belknap Press of Harvard University Press
- Lewis, Mark Edward (2009), China Between Empires, Belknap Press of Harvard University Press
- Liang, Jieming (2006), Chinese Siege Warfare: Mechanical Artillery & Siege Weapons of Antiquity, Singapore, Republic of Singapore: Leong Kit Meng, ISBN 981-05-5380-3
- Lo Jung-pang (2012). China as a Sea Power, 1127–1368: A Preliminary Survey of the Maritime Expansion and Naval Exploits of the Chinese People During the Southern Song and Yuan Periods (illustrated ed.). NUS Press. ISBN 978-9971695057.
- Loades, Mike (2018), The Crossbow, Osprey
- Loewe, Michael (2000), A BIOGRAPHICAL DICTIONARY OF THE QIN, FORMER HAN AND XIN PERIODS (221 BC – AD 24), Brill
- Lorge, Peter A. (2011), Chinese Martial Arts: From Antiquity to the Twenty-First Century, Cambridge: Cambridge University Press, ISBN 978-0-521-87881-4
- Lorge, Peter (2015), The Reunification of China: Peace through War under the Song Dynasty, Cambridge University Press
- Mesny, William (1896), Mesny's Chinese Miscellany
- Needham, Joseph (1994), Science and Civilization in China Volume 5 Part 6, Cambridge University Press
- Peers, C.J. (1990), Ancient Chinese Armies: 1500-200BC, Osprey Publishing
- Peers, C.J. (1992), Medieval Chinese Armies: 1260–1520, Osprey Publishing
- Peers, C.J. (1995), Imperial Chinese Armies (1): 200BC-AD589, Osprey Publishing
- Peers, C.J. (1996), Imperial Chinese Armies (2): 590-1260AD, Osprey Publishing
- Peers, C.J. (1997), Late Imperial Chinese Armies: 1520–1840, Osprey Publishing, ISBN 978-1-85532-655-2
- Peers, C.J. (2006), Soldiers of the Dragon: Chinese Armies 1500 BC – AD 1840, Osprey Publishing Ltd
- Peers, Chris (2013), Battles of Ancient China, Pen & Sword Military
- Perdue, Peter C. (2005), China Marches West, The Belknap Press of Harvard University Press
- Rnad, Christopher C. (2017), Military Thought in Early China, SUNY Press
- Robinson, K.G. (2004), Science and Civilization in China Volume 7 Part 2: General Conclusions and Reflections, Cambridge University Press
- Romane, Julian (2018), Rise of the Tang Dynasty
- Selby, Stephen (2000), Chinese Archery, Hong Kong University Press, ISBN 9622095011
- Swope, Kenneth M. (2009), A Dragon's Head and a Serpent's Tail: Ming China and the First Great East Asian War, 1592–1598, University of Oklahoma Press
- Taylor, Jay (1983), The Birth of the Vietnamese, University of California Press
- Taylor, K.W. (2013), A History of the Vietnamese, Cambridge University Press
- Turnbull, Stephen (2001), Siege Weapons of the Far East (1) AD 612–1300, Osprey Publishing
- Turnbull, Stephen (2002), Siege Weapons of the Far East (2) AD 960–1644, Osprey Publishing
- Twitchett, Denis (2008), The Cambridge History of China: Volume 1, Cambridge University Press
- Watson, Burton (1993), Records of the Grand Historian by Sima Qian: Han Dynasty II (Revised Edition, Columbia University Press
- Whiting, Marvin C. (2002), Imperial Chinese Military History, Writers Club Press
- Wood, W. W. (1830), Sketches of China
- Wagner, Donald B. (2008), Science and Civilization in China Volume 5–11: Ferrous Metallurgy, Cambridge University Press
- Wright, David (2005), From War to Diplomatic Parity in Eleventh Century China, Brill
