= Protectorate of the Western Regions =

Region of Han dynasty suzerainty over previously independent states

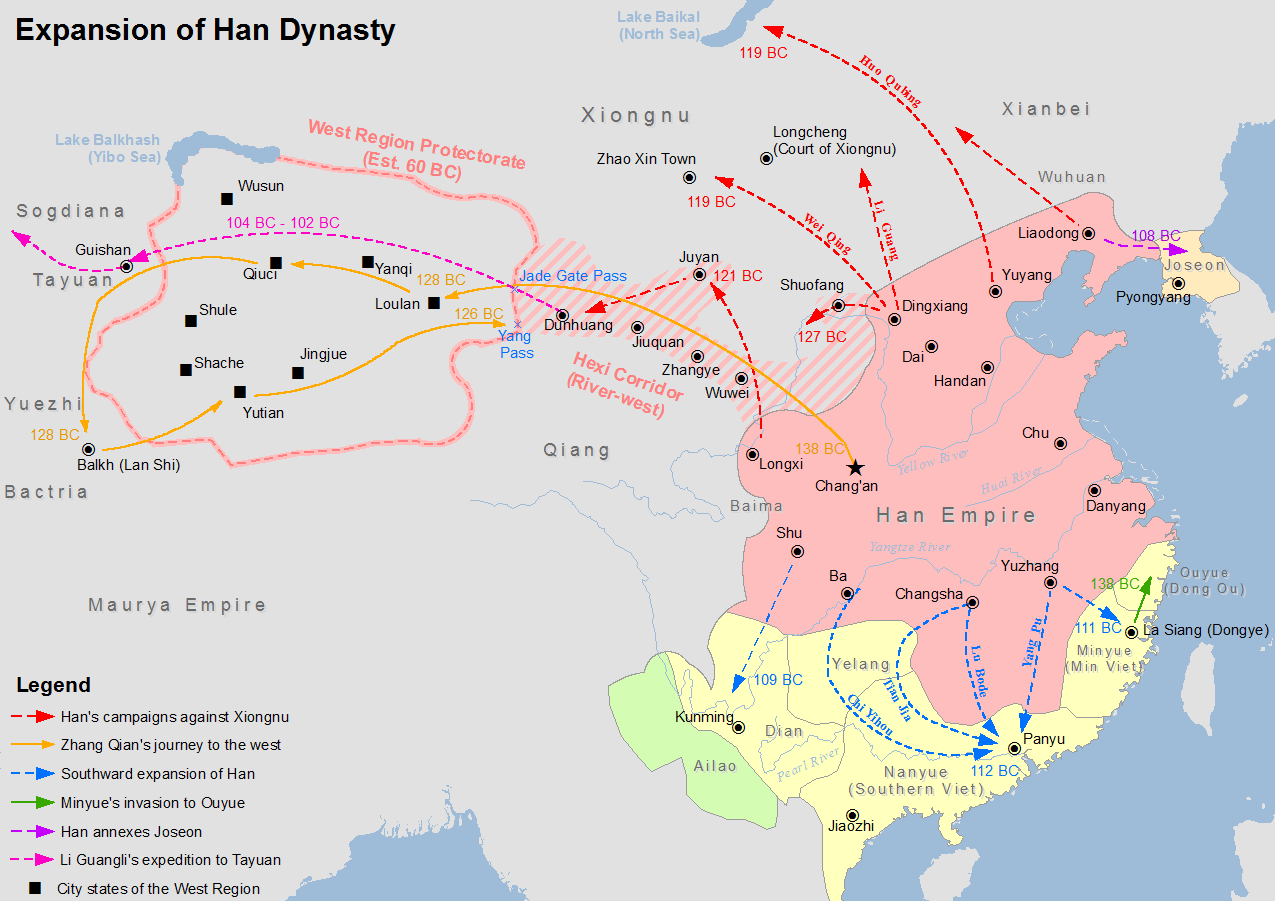
Expansion of the Han dynasty into the Western Regions

The Protectorate of the Western Regions (simplified Chinese: 西域都护府; traditional Chinese: 西域都護府; pinyin: Xīyù Dūhù Fǔ; Wade–Giles: Hsi^{1}-yü^{4} Tu^{1}-hu^{4} Fu^{3}) was an imperial administration (a protectorate) situated in the Western Regions administered by Han dynasty China and its successors on and off from 59 or 60 BCE until the end of the Sixteen Kingdoms period in 439 AD. The "Western Regions" refers to areas west of Yumen Pass, especially the Tarim Basin in southern Xinjiang. These areas would later be termed Altishahr (southern Xinjiang, excluding Dzungaria) by Turkic-speaking peoples. The term "western regions" was also used by the Chinese more generally to refer to Central Asia.

The protectorate was the first direct rule by a Chinese government of the area. It consisted of various vassal states and Han garrisons placed under the authority of a protector-general of the Western Regions, who was appointed by the Han court.

== History ==
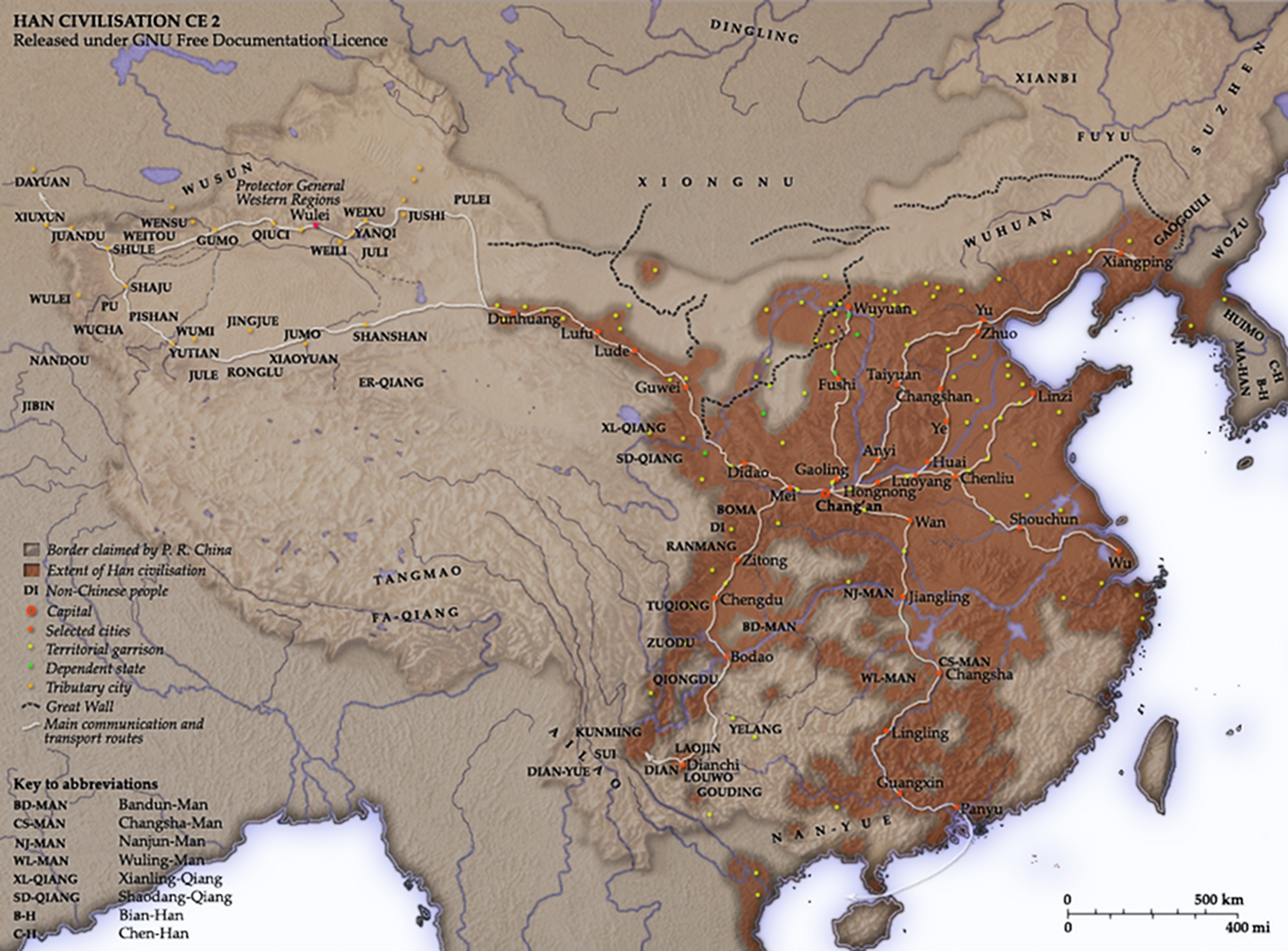
Garrisons of the Han dynasty

=== Background ===
Prior to the establishment of the protectorate, there was a preceding post known as the "Colonel [for the Assistance of Imperial] Envoys" that was established a year after the War of the Heavenly Horses ended in 101 BC. After the war, Han posts were erected between Dunhuang and the Salt Marsh with several hundred farmer soldiers stationed at Lúntái and Qúlí. The post was established to guard their farmland and to take care of grain storage for Han envoys traveling to other states. Lúntái 輪臺 (Minimal Old Chinese *run-də̂, Later Han luin-də), formerly transcribed Lúntóu 侖頭 (Minimal Old Chinese *run-dô, Later Han *luin-do), had been earlier destroyed by the Chinese general Lǐ Guǎnglì 李廣利 in 102 BCE.

During the Han–Xiongnu War, the Chinese empire established a military garrison at this place., in present Luntai County. The Chinese sought to control the Western Regions to keep the Xiongnu away from Inner China, and to control the valuable Silk Road trade that passed through the area. The local inhabitants of the Western Regions were diverse, and the area contained several groups who originated in Western Eurasia and/or spoke Indo-European languages. These groups included Tocharian-speaking city-states like Ārśi (Arshi; later Agni/Karasahr), Kuča (Kucha), Gumo (later Aksu), Turfan (Turpan), and Loulan (Krorän/Korla). Additionally, residents of the oasis city-states of Khotan and Kashgar spoke Saka, one of the Eastern Iranian languages.

=== Establishment ===
The position of protector-general was officially established in 59 or 60 BCE after the Southern Xiongnu ruler Bi, the Rizhu King of the Right, submitted to the Han dynasty. Rizhu was bestowed the title of Marquis of Allegiance to Imperial Authority while Zheng Ji, the envoy who received him, was commissioned to act as protector-general of both the Northern and Southern routes. Another account states that the post of protector-general had already been established by 64 BC and Zheng Ji was sent out to meet Rizhu, who led over 10,000 Xiongnu to submit to Han authority. Under the protector-general was a deputy colonel of the Western Regions.

The protector-general established a general headquarters at Wūlěi 烏壘 (Minimal Old Chinese *ʔâ-ruiʔ, Later Han *ʔɑ-luiᴮ): 吉於是中西域而立莫府，治烏壘城 "Zheng Ji then established his headquarters in the central western regions, governing the city of Wūlěi". Wūlěi is situated is 350 lǐ east of Kucha and 330 lǐ north to Qúlí 渠犁 (Minimal Old Chinese *ga-rî/ri, Later Han *gɨɑ-lei/liᴮ), itself on the east of a river and 580 lǐ east of Kucha.

It was the highest Han dynasty military position in the west during its existence. During the peak of the protectorate's power in 51 BCE, the Wusun nation was brought under Han submission. The post was abandoned after the usurpation of Wang Mang (Xin dynasty) from 8 to 22 CE. By then, at least 18 different people had served as protector-general, though only 10 of them have known names. In 45 CE, the eighteen states of the Western Regions requested the re-establishment of the protectorate to restore peace to the region, but Emperor Guangwu of Han refused.

During the second half of the first century CE, at the time of the Eastern Han dynasty, Chinese armies led by Ban Chao, Dou Gu, and Guo Xun brought the Western Regions back under Han control. The protectorate was thus re-established. In 74 CE, Emperor Ming of Han and his successor awarded the position of protector-general (now with administrative obligations as well) to general Chen Mu. Chen Mu was killed by the rebellious troops of Yanqi and Qiuci. In 83 CE, the office of Chief Official of the Western Regions was established and awarded to Ban Chao. The position of the chief official was beneath that of the protector-general. Ban Chao would later be made protector-general in 91 CE, after which he reconquered the Western Regions. The seat of the protectorate was for a time shifted to Taqian (or Tagan; near modern Kucha). Ban Chao was succeeded by Ren Shang and Duan Xi.

On 29 July 107, a series of Qiang uprisings in the areas of Hexi Corridor and Guanzhong. Duan Xi was killed and the post was abandoned. The protectorate was later restored from 123 to 124 by the son of Ban Chao, Ban Yong. The protectorate was again revived in 335 by Former Liang and headquartered in Gaochang until the demise of Northern Liang.

In the southern Tarim Basin, coins from the period of the protectorate's existence have been found with inscriptions in both Chinese and the Kharoshthi script, which was used for local Indo-European languages.

In the 7th century, a successor administration, the Protectorate General to Pacify the West was established by the Tang dynasty at Xizhou (Turpan) and was later moved to Kucha.

== Localisation ==
Historians and archaeologists have debated the location of the archaeological site corresponding to the seat of the Protectorate of the Western Regions. According to the current state of archaeology, one of the candidates is the Zorküt Ancient City, due to the size of the site.

== Thirty-six city states ==
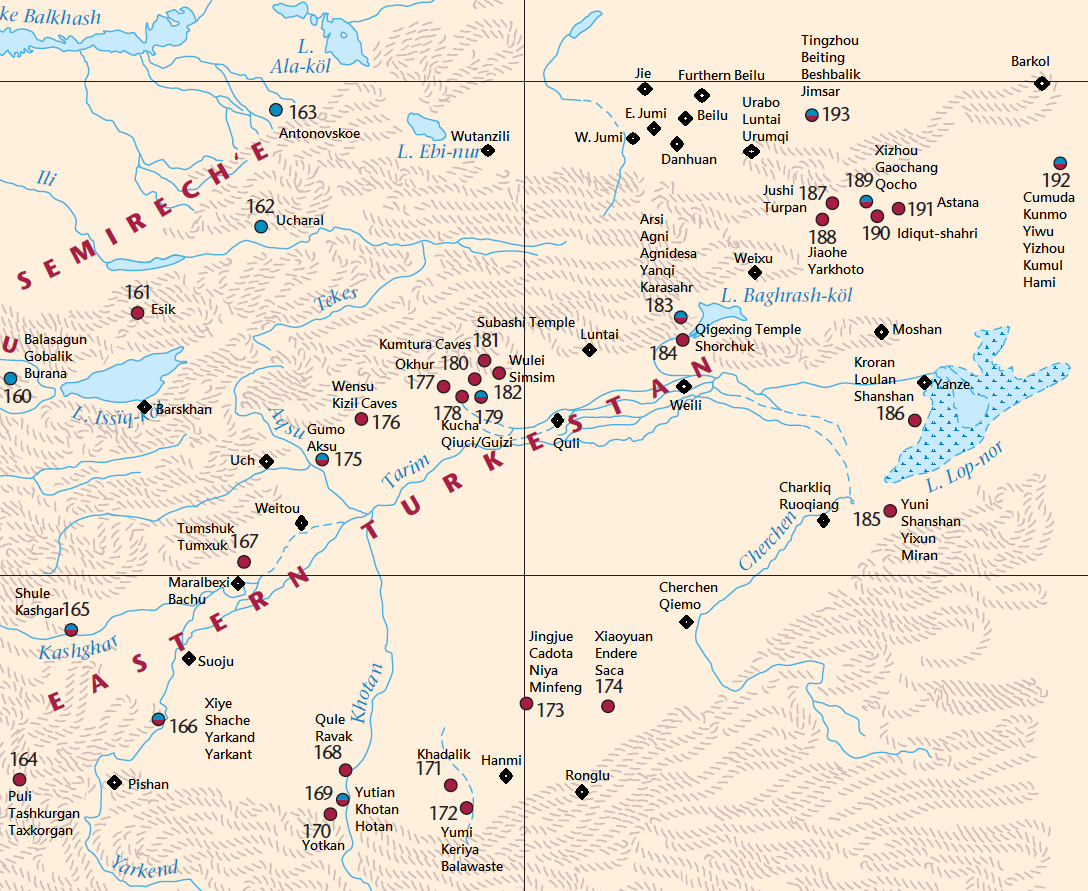
Historical cities of the Tarim Basin

City states of the Western Regions (from the Book of Han)
City	Households	Population	Soldiers
Beilu	277	1,387	422
Further Beilu	462	1,137	350
Danhuan	27	194	45
Guhu	55	264	45
Gumo	3,500	24,500	4,500
Hanmi	3,340	20,040	3,540
Jie	99	500	115
Jingjue	480	3,360	500
Eastern Jumi	191	1,948	572
Western Jumi	332	1,926	738
Jushi	700	6,050	1,865
Further Jushi	595	4,774	1,890
Loulan	1,570	14,100	2,912
Moshan	450	5,000	1,000
Pishan	500	3,500	500
Pulei	325	2,032	799
Further Pulei	100	1,070	334
Qiangruo	450,	1,750	500
Qiemo	230	1,610	320
Qiuci	6,970	81,317	21,076
Qule	310	2,170	300
Quli	240	1,610	300
Shule	1,510	18,647	2,000
Suoju	2,339	16,373	3,049
Weili	1,200	9,600	2,000
Weitou	300	2,300	800
Weixu	700	4,900	2,000
Wensu	2,200	8,400	1,500
Wulei (Central Command)	110	1,200	300
Wutanzili	41	231	57
Xiaoyuan	150	1,050	200
Xiye	350	4,000	1,000
Yanqi (colony)	4,000	32,100	6,000
Yulishi	190	1,445	331
Yutian	3,300	19,300	2,400

== List of protectors-general ==
=== Western Han and Xin ===
- Zheng Ji 60－48 BCE
- Han Xuan (韓宣) 48－45 BCE
- Unknown (3rd) 45－42 BCE
- Unknown (4th) 42－39 BCE
- Unknown (5th) 39－36 BCE
- Gan Yanshou (甘延壽) 36－33 BCE
- Duan Huizong (段會宗) 33－30, 21－18 BCE
- Lian Bao (廉褒) 30－27 BCE
- Unknown (9th) 27－24 BCE
- Han Li (韓立) 24－21 BCE
- Unknown (11th) 18－15 BCE
- Guo Shun (郭舜) 15－12 BCE
- Sun Jian (孫建) 12－9 BCE
- Unknown (14th) 9－6 BCE
- Unknown (15th) 6－3 BCE
- Unknown (16th) 3 BCE－1 CE
- Dan Qin (但欽) 1－13 CE
- Li Chong 13－23 CE

=== Eastern Han ===
- Chen Mu 74－75
- Ban Chao 91－102
- Ren Shang 102－106
- Duan Xi 106－107

== Maps ==
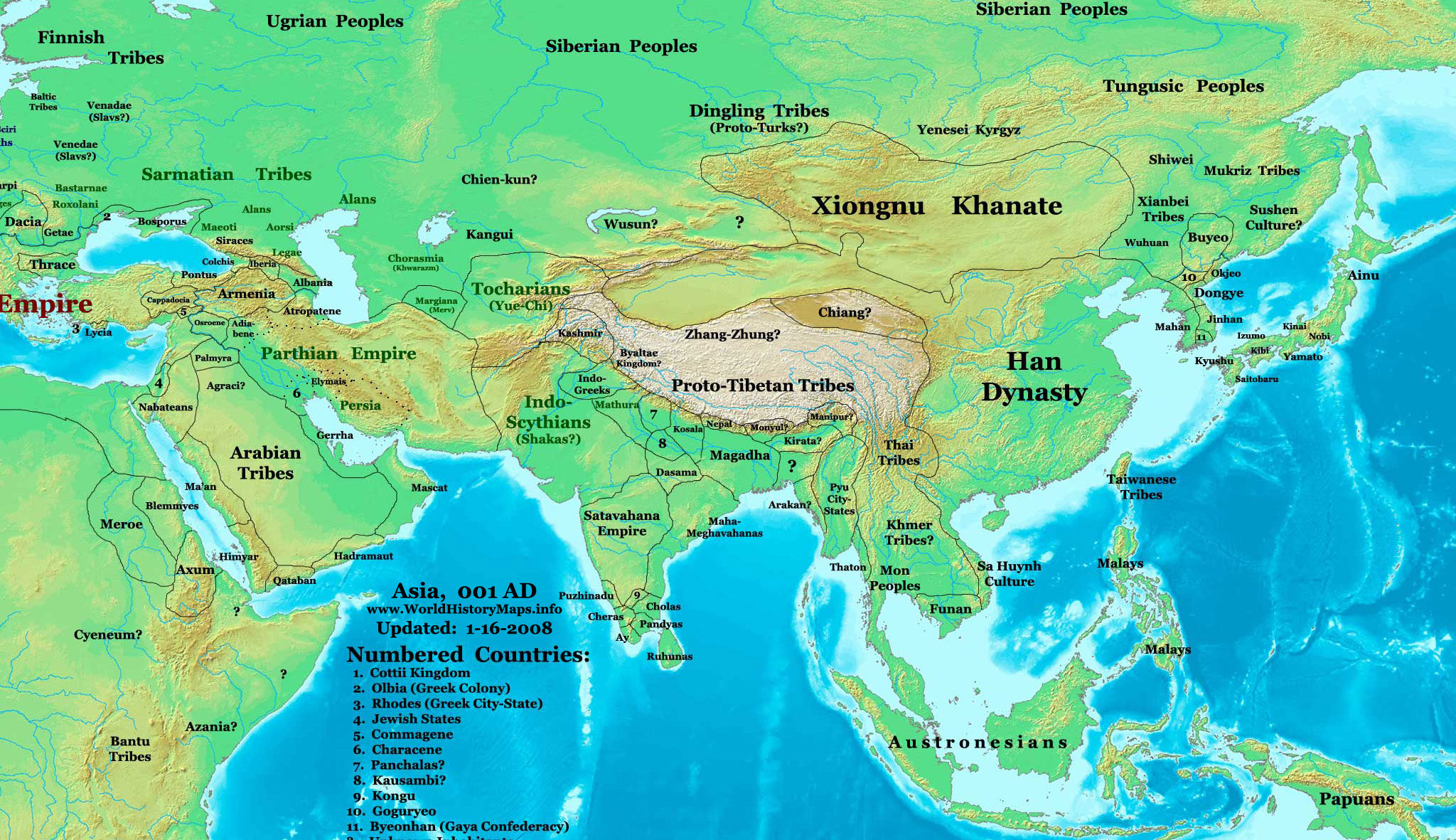
Asia in 1 AD. The Western Regions were at the centre of the map (south-west of the Xiongnu)

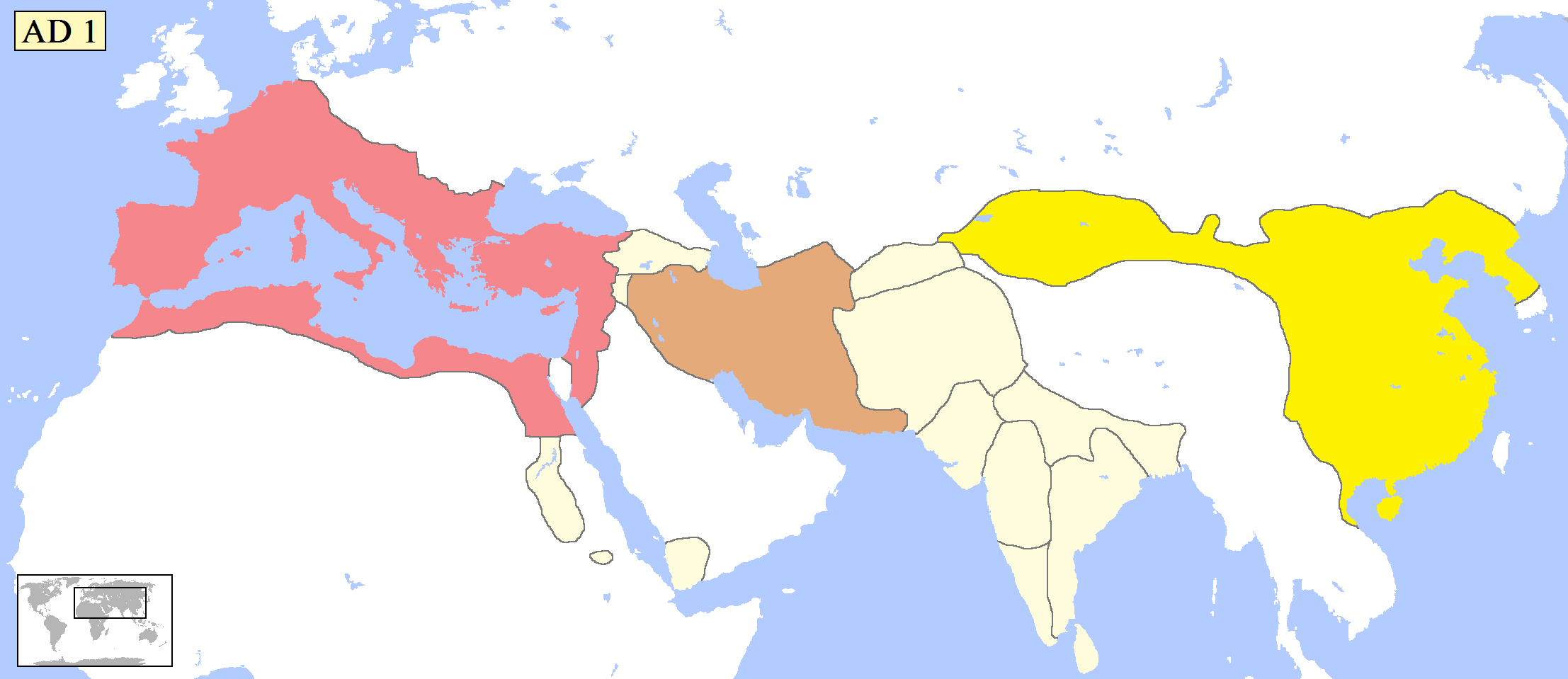
The Han dynasty (yellow) in 1 AD.

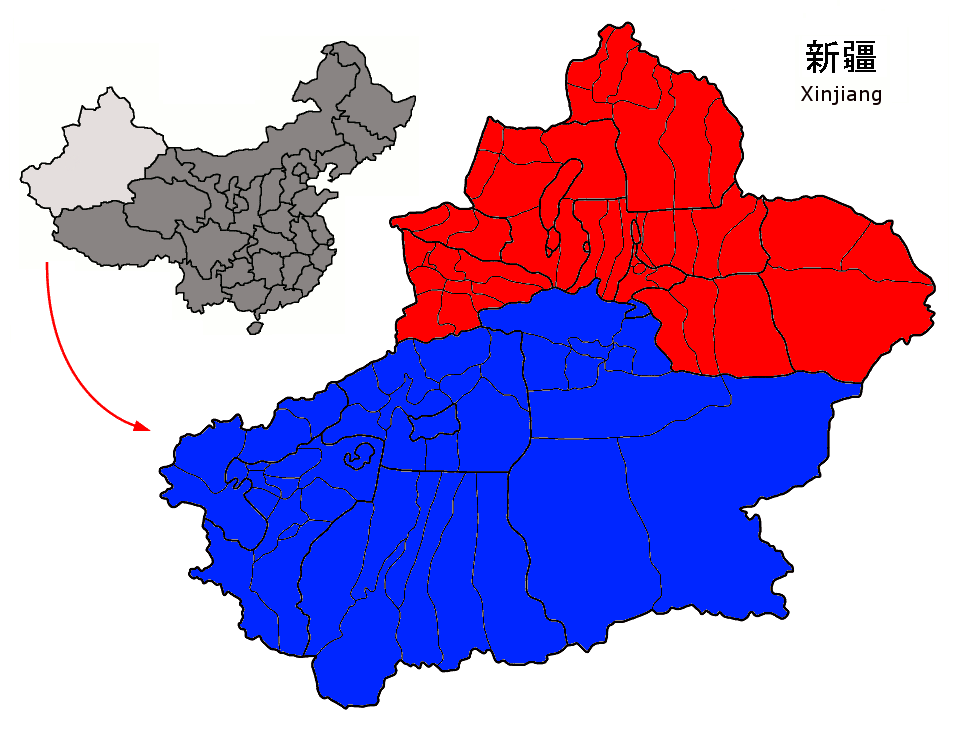
Modern Xinjiang, showing
the Tarim Basin
Dzungaria

1st century BC

== See also ==
- Chief Official of the Western Regions
- Sogdia
- Han dynasty in Inner Asia
  - Han–Xiongnu War
  - War of the Heavenly Horses
- Tang dynasty in Inner Asia
  - Protectorate General to Pacify the West
  - Beiting Protectorate
- Qing dynasty in Inner Asia
  - Xinjiang under Qing rule

== Bibliography ==
- Cosmo, Nicola Di (2002), Ancient China and Its Enemies, Cambridge University Press
- Cosmo, Nicola di (2009), Military Culture in Imperial China, Harvard University Press
- Twitchett, Denis (2008), The Cambridge History of China: Volume 1, Cambridge University Press
