= Battle of Loulan =

Battle

- Part of the Han–Xiongnu War
Date	December, 108 BC
Location	Lop Nur, Xinjiang
Result	Han victory

Belligerents
Loulan	Han dynasty

Commanders and leaders
Unknown	Zhao Ponu

Strength
Unknown	700 light cavalries

The Battle of Loulan (Chinese: 樓蘭之戰) in 108 BC marks the earliest military venture by the Western Han dynasty into the Tarim Basin, after a conflict with the Xiongnu-aligned Loulan Kingdom and Jushi Kingdom. The king of Loulan Angui death sentenced two Chinese diplomats, and turned on the offense against Jushi. The battle resulted in the submission of both Wusun and Dayuan, and an increased role, reputation, and status for the Han dynasty in Inner Asia.

== Aftermath ==
The Loulan kingdom ceased to exist in 77 BC, as the last king of Loulan, Angui, was assassinated by two of Fu Jiezi's men during a banquet. The Han deposited one of his kin, Weituyan. They also changed the name Loulan to Shanshan in the same year, as the capital was moved south west to the city of Wuni (which was no longer situated in the Lop Nur). Loulan Kingdom migrated towards khotan and continued their rule from khotan till their last King Vijay Sangràma

== See also ==
- Han dynasty in Inner Asia
- Western Regions
