= 102 BC =

102 BC in various calendars
- Gregorian calendar: 102 BC; CII BC
- Ab urbe condita: 652
- Ancient Egypt era: XXXIII dynasty, 222
- Pharaoh: Ptolemy X Alexander, 6
- Ancient Greek Olympiad (summer): 169th Olympiad, year 3
- Assyrian calendar: 4649
- Balinese saka calendar: N/A
- Bengali calendar: −695 – −694
- Berber calendar: 849
- Buddhist calendar: 443
- Burmese calendar: −739
- Byzantine calendar: 5407–5408
- Chinese calendar: 戊寅年 (Earth Tiger); 2596 or 2389 — to — 己卯年 (Earth Rabbit); 2597 or 2390
- Coptic calendar: −385 – −384
- Discordian calendar: 1065
- Ethiopian calendar: −109 – −108
- Hebrew calendar: 3659–3660
- Hindu calendars
- Vikram Samvat: −45 – −44
- Shaka Samvat: N/A
- Kali Yuga: 2999–3000
- Holocene calendar: 9899
- Iranian calendar: 723 BP – 722 BP
- Islamic calendar: 745 BH – 744 BH
- Javanese calendar: N/A
- Julian calendar: N/A
- Korean calendar: 2232
- Minguo calendar: 2013 before ROC 民前2013年
- Nanakshahi calendar: −1569
- Seleucid era: 210/211 AG
- Thai solar calendar: 441–442
- Tibetan calendar: ས་ཕོ་སྟག་ལོ་ (male Earth-Tiger); 25 or −356 or −1128 — to — ས་མོ་ཡོས་ལོ་ (female Earth-Hare); 26 or −355 or −1127

Year 102 BC was a year of the pre-Julian Roman calendar. At the time it was known as the Year of the Consulship of Marius and Catulus (or, less frequently, year 652 Ab urbe condita) and the Third Year of Taichu. The denomination 102 BC for this year has been used since the early medieval period, when the Anno Domini calendar era became the prevalent method in Europe for naming years.

== Events ==
=== By place ===
==== Roman Republic ====
- Gaius Marius defeats the Sciri and Teutones at Aix-en-Provence (or Battle of Aquae Sextae).
- Marcus Marius was likely elected praetor for 102 BC.
- The Cimbri defeat the Consul Quintus Lutatius Catulus in the Adige Valley.

==== Asia ====
- War of the Heavenly Horses: the Han expeditionary force under Li Guangli conquers the state of Luntai. Li Guangli then besieges Alexandria Eschate, the capital of Dayuan in the Hellenistic Ferghana Valley, despite having lost half his army to hunger, thirst and battle by the time he reached the city. The Dayuan are defeated in battle, and after losing their outer wall and their best general Jianmi in battle, the nobles kill King Wugua and offer terms of peace to Li Guangli, who accepts. The Han receive some of the prized horses of Dayuan and Li Guangli appoints Mocai as the new king.
- Han-Xiongnu War

- Er Chanyu marches against Shouxiang but dies en route from illness and is succeeded by his uncle Xulihu.
- Emperor Wu orders fortified outposts to be built to the north as far as the Yin Mountains and Juyan Lake. The generals Han Yue and Wei Kang garrison the outposts north of Wuyuan, including the Yin Mountains, and Lu Bode garrisons Juyan Lake.
- Autumn – The Xiongnu invade the prefectures of Yunzhong, Dingxiang, Wuyuan and Shuofang and destroy the new Han outposts. The Tuqi King of the Right invades the area around Jiuquan and Zhangye. The Han general Ren Wen defeats a Xiongnu army.

== Births ==
- Quintus Tullius Cicero, Roman general and statesman (d. 43 BC)
