= Battle of Yiwulu =

Battle during major Han dynasty expedition against the Xiongnu (AD 73)

- Part of the Han–Xiongnu War
Date	February AD 73
Location	Kumul, Xinjiang
Result	Han victory

Belligerents
Northern Xiongnu	Han dynasty

Commanders and leaders
Prince Huyan	Dou Gu; Geng Chong

Units involved
Unknown	Army of the Han dynasty: Han regulars; Southern Xiongnu, Qiang, Wuhuan, and Xianbei auxiliaries

Strength
Unknown	12,000

Casualties and losses
1,000 dead	Unknown

The Battle of Yiwulu took place during a major Han dynasty expedition against the Xiongnu in February AD 73, after the fall of the Xin dynasty. The battle was a success for the Han, who were led by Dou Gu. In 73, annoyed at the Xiongnu's constant incursions against the northern border, the Han dynasty dispatched four columns, commissioned generals Dou Gu and Geng Chong to lead an army against the Xiongnu from Jiuquan. The majority of this expedition had only minor successes, with the exception of the capture of Yiwulu.

== Aftermath ==
In Yiwulu, Dou Gu set up an agricultural garrison, and appointed a commander to make sure that the army stationed in the Western Regions had a lasting supply of provisions. In the same year, Dou Gu sent Ban Chao and Guo Xun along with 36 men to go south. Ban Chao successfully organised the states of Shanshan, Yutian and Shule against the Xiongnu, restoring peace and order in the Western Regions. Subsequently, in AD 74, the Han government reestablished the Protectorate of the Western Regions, in the city of Jinman in the state of North Jushi. In 75, on the death of Emperor Ming of Han, the Xiongnu with its allies seized their opportunity and captured Jushi and Liuzhong, and killed Protector General Chen Mu. In 76, the Han government repealed the Protectorate of the Western Regions. As the Western Region's situation was becoming precarious, Ban Chao, who was left to defend Shule and Yutian, won the support of the local officials and people and drove the Xiongnu troops from the capital of Gumo in Shicheng. In 80, he wrote to the imperial court, proposing that they send more troops to the Western Regions. The new emperor agreed to his proposal and ordered Xu Gan to lead an army to help Ban Chao.

During the war against the Xiongnu's allies –which lasted several decades– Ban Chao distinguished himself as a statesman and strategist. Relying on the various nationalities in the Western Regions, he united all the people and maintained the unity of the empire. In 90, Ban Chao detained an envoy from Kushan who requested a marriage for his king. In retaliation, the Kushan marched on Ban Chao with a force of 70,000 under commander Xie, and besieged the city of Shule for about ten days. Ban Chao continued to defend the city, until the attackers exhausted their food supplies and retreated. In 91, the Han government appointed Ban Chao the Protector General of the Western Regions, with his office in Tanqian, state of Qiuci. In 94, Ban Chao organised an army of 70,000 mercenaries, approached and arrested the kings of Yanqi and Yuli. They were executed where Chen Mu was killed. In 97, Ban Chao commissioned an envoy named Gan Ying to visit Rome. He was unsuccessful, but returned after traveling as far as the Black Sea.

For more than thirty years Ban Chao worked in the Western Regions until he was seventy, when he retired and returned to Luoyang. Ren Shang succeeded Ban Chao as the Protector General of the Western Regions in 102, but as he was unkind and harsh toward the local people, they rose up against him, sending the region into disorder. The Han court soon recalled him in 106, and replaced him with Duan Xi. On July 29, 107, the Han government repealed the protector generalship, and recalled Duan Xi back under the escort of General Wang Hong.

== Bibliography ==
- Fan Ye et al., Hou Hanshu. Beijing: Zhonghua Shuju, 1965. ISBN 7-101-00306-0
- Sima Guang, comp. Zizhi Tongjian. Beijing: Zhonghua Shuju, 1956. ISBN 7-101-00183-1
- Graff, David A. (2002). Medieval Chinese Warfare, 300 – 900. London, New York City: Routledge. ISBN 0-415-23955-9.
