= Li Chong =

Li Chong may refer to:

- Li Chong (General) (李崇), Protector-General of the Western Regions, Qin Dynasty
- Li Chong (Daxun) (李充), courtesy name Daxun (大遜), Eastern Han dynasty official
- Li Chong (Eastern Jin) (李充), courtesy name Hongdu (弘度), Eastern Jin poet and literary thinker.
- Li Chong (Tang dynasty) (李沖; died 688), Tang dynasty prince who resisted Wu Zetian
- Li Chong (EastEnders), fictional character in the BBC soap opera EastEnders
