= Zorküt Ancient City =

Archaeological site in Xinjiang, China

Coordinates: 41°45′N 84°45′E

- 卓尔库特古城遗址 (Chinese)
- Zhuó'ěrkǔtè Ancient City Ruins; Zorküt Ancient City Ruins (Uyghur: زوركۈت قەدىمىي شەھىرى خارابىسى, Zorküt qedimiy shehiri xarabisi)
- Interactive map of Zorküt Ancient City
- Type: Ancient walled city
- Periods: Late Warring States to Wei–Jin
- Location: Luntai County, Bayingolin Mongol Autonomous Prefecture, Xinjiang Uyghur Autonomous Region, China

History
- Built: Late Warring States period
- Abandoned: Wei–Jin period

Site notes
- Area: Outer city approx. 330,000 m²
- Condition: Ruins

Zorküt Ancient City (Chinese: 卓尔库特古城遗址; pinyin: Zhuó'ěrkǔtè gǔchéng yízhǐ; Uyghur: زوركۈت قەدىمىي شەھىرى خارابىسى, Zorküt qedimiy shehiri xarabisi), also referred to as Zhuó'ěrkǔtè Ancient City Ruins, is an archaeological site in Luntai County, Bayingolin Mongol Autonomous Prefecture, Xinjiang, China. The city was constructed in the late Warring States period and abandoned during the Wei–Jin period. As of 2020, it is the highest-grade central site known along the northern edge of the Tarim Basin for that era. In October 2019, the site was listed among the Eighth Batch of Major National Historical and Cultural Sites in China.

== Overview ==
The Zorküt Ancient City Ruins lie about 24 km southeast of the modern county seat of Luntai County, situated in a desert area where red willow (Tamarix) is common around the site. Approximately 2 km to the east is the Kizil Valley (克孜勒沟); it is under 12 km from another nationally protected site, the Kuonaxie Haier Ancient City (阔纳协海尔古城), and about 10 km from the Kuiyuke Xiehaier Ancient City (奎玉克协海尔古城).

The site exhibits a rare three-tiered city layout in Xinjiang and Central Asia: an outer city, a middle (inner) city, and a high-platform citadel within. The outermost enclosure covers approximately 330,000 m²; traces of its walls remain on the inner side. The middle enclosure (first surveyed) is an irregular circular shape with a perimeter of about 1,250 m; a modern irrigation channel now crosses through it, and due to the low-lying terrain the site often collects water. The inner city walls have collapsed into earthen embankments; the northern section is incomplete. Wall bases vary from 3 m to 6 m in width and stand 1.5–2.5 m high. The ancient gate passage is at the southwest corner, about 10 m wide.

On the east side of the inner city is a projecting high platform up to 9 m tall; on top of which there is a walled enclosure with internal house remains forming the third-tier citadel. The base of this citadel wall reaches 25 m in width; multiple construction phases are evident, corresponding to the Warring States–Western Han, Eastern Han, and Wei–Jin periods. Gate passages about 8 m wide exist on its east and west sides. The citadel is elongated north–south. Within, a central north–south main wall divides two halves; houses are built along this main wall, with the central area higher and slopes to north and south. Excavated single-house remains here are among the largest in Xinjiang when first uncovered. Dwellings are primarily earthen rafters-and-purlin structures; outside the citadel walls there are ancillary timber-frame sheds. Additionally, in the southern part of the inner city is an earthen platform with a circumference of about 70 m and residual height around 4 m. About 300 m northeast of the city is another residential site measuring roughly 33 m by 35 m, about 4 m high. Pottery sherds, and animal bones (camel, horse, cattle, sheep), iron implements, stone tools, bone artifacts, etc., have been recovered here.

== Period ==
Han-period artifacts unearthed at Zorküt display characteristics typical of the Chang'an region. By the Wei–Jin period, artifacts clearly show influence from Kucha culture. Radiocarbon dating, stratigraphy, and associated finds all indicate construction in the late Warring States period and abandonment in the Wei–Jin period. Early surveys speculated it might have been a Han dynasty military-agricultural outpost headquarters (“tuntian xiaowei city”), and some later proposed it as the seat of the Protectorate of the Western Regions (in Wūlěi 烏壘). Excavations in the late 2010s confirmed that Zorküt was one of the most important cities in the northern Tarim Basin during the Han–Jin period. It may have been the seat of the Protectorate, although there is no definitive proof.

== Excavation and preservation ==
The earliest modern record of the site dates to August 1928, when archaeologist Huáng Wénbì (黄文弼) surveyed it (then called Zhuōguǒtèqìn Ancient City) during his fieldwork in Korla and Luntai areas, recording red-ground black-painted pottery sherds and iron spearheads with handles, documented in Tǎlǐmù Péndì Kǎogǔjì 塔里木盆地考古记.

Afterwards, the site received little scholarly attention until 1980, when staff from the Xinjiang Museum conducted more detailed surveys and measurements, collecting coarse handmade pottery fragments (jars, pots). During the Second National Cultural Relics Census (1989–1990), the Xinjiang relics census office investigated and recorded the site, noting poor preservation on the surface with sand-tempered red-brown and gray-brown pottery sherds. In the Third National Cultural Relics Census (2009), a revisit was made to the site. In 2017, archaeological surveys and drilling in Xinhe and Luntai Counties confirmed traces of the outer city. From 2018, with approval from the State Administration of Cultural Heritage, a joint archaeological team from Peking University Archaeology and Museology Institute and the Xinjiang Autonomous Region Institute of Cultural Relics and Archaeology launched the “Western Regions Protectorate Archaeology” project; Zorküt Ancient City was among the initial excavation projects. These excavations revealed the outer city remains, portions of walls, timber-frame houses outside the walls, the high-platform citadel, wells, etc., yielding pottery sherds and various artifacts.

In July 1999, Zorküt Ancient City was designated as a Xinjiang Uyghur Autonomous Region-level protected cultural relics site. On 7 October 2019, the State Council of the People’s Republic of China officially listed it among the Eighth Batch of Major National Historical and Cultural Sites.
