= Battle of Jushi =

Battle in Ming China

- Part of the Han–Xiongnu War
Date	December, 67 BC
Location	Turpan, Xinjiang
Result	Han victory

Belligerents
Xiongnu	Han dynasty

Commanders and leaders
Wugui	Zheng Ji; Sima Xi

Strength
Unknown	1,500 Han regulars with 10,000 Tarim Basin allies

The Battle of Jushi (Chinese: 車師之戰; pinyin: Jūshī Zhī Zhàn) took place between the Han dynasty and the Xiongnu for control of the people of the Jushi culture in the Turpan Basin in 67 BC. The battle was a success for the Han, who were led by Zheng Ji. The king of Jushi Wugui surrendered to the Han after the Han launched the attack from the Tarim Basin and besieged the city Jiaohe, capital of Jushi. The Xiongnu came with aid to Jushi, but escaped after Zheng Ji and Sima Xi confronted the armies. Zheng Ji then left 20 men with a general to protect the king of Jushi, but he was afraid of the return of Xiongnu, and fled to Wusun. The Xiongnu installed Doumo as the king of Jushi, and moved the population further east from Jiaohe. Zheng Ji then sent 300 men to seize the city.

== Aftermath ==
In 60 BC, an internal disturbance occurred among the Xiongnu ruling clique, and Xianxianshan, Prince Rizhu of the Xiongnu stationed in the Turpan Basin, led 12,000 of his troops and 12 royals to pledge allegiance to the Han imperial court. That same year, the Han appointed Zheng Ji as the Protector General of the Western Regions, with his office in Wulei (near Qiuci) to oversee the entire region of the Tarim Basin west to the Pamir. The last Protector General, Dan Qin, was killed during a rebellion led by Yanqi in 13 AD. A brief attempt to restore the protector generalship was launched by Wang Mang in 16 AD, under the new appointed Protector General Li Chong. The armies soon advanced towards the state of Yanqi, but were eventually defeated by Yanqi with its allies. Li Chong fled to the state of Qiuci, and died soon after the fall of Xin dynasty.
