= Han dynasty in Inner Asia =

Han dynasty's expansion of realm and influence in Inner Asia

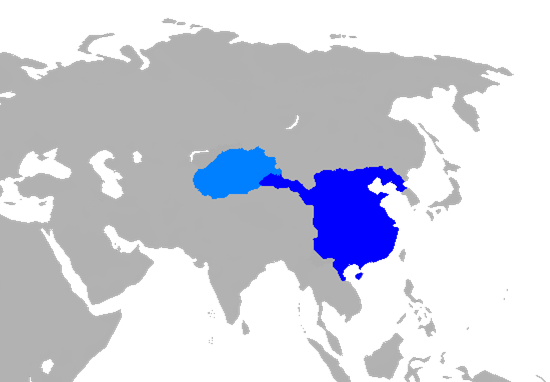
A map of the Western Han dynasty in 2 AD

The Han dynasty in Inner Asia was the expansion of the Han dynasty's realm and influence in Inner Asia with a series of Chinese military campaigns and expeditions since the reign of the Emperor Wu of Han. Wars were mainly fought against the nomadic Xiongnu confederation based in the Mongolian Plateau, but also against other states in the Western Regions (especially in the Tarim Basin) like the Saka-ruled (Scythian) Greco-Bactrian Kingdom known to the Chinese as Dayuan. As a result, the Han dynasty at its height greatly expanded its power into Central Asia, controlling most of present-day Xinjiang and portions of modern Inner Mongolia with the establishment of the Protectorate of the Western Regions and the vassalization of Southern Xiongnu.

== History ==
=== Against Xiongnu ===
During the early Han dynasty China made peace with the powerful Mongolian Plateau-based nomadic tribes which became known as the Xiongnu confederation. The early Han dynasty adopted a policy known as the "marriage alliance" to appease the Xiongnu, who still raided Chinese borderlands routinely. However, starting from the reign of the seventh Han ruler, Emperor Wu, the Han Empire began to change from a relatively passive foreign policy to a proactively offensive strategy seeking to permanently remove the northern threat. The tension fully escalated in 133 BC when the Han army unsuccessfully tried to ambush Xiongnu raiders at Mayi, and retaliatory raids intensified. Emperor Wu then started deploying newer generations of military commanders and launched several expeditions to control the Ordos Loop, Hexi Corridor and Western Regions, eventually pushing the Xiongnu north beyond the Gobi Desert with a decisive campaign in 119 BC. After the death of Emperor Wu in 87 BC, the war winded down to mostly smaller border conflicts, although Emperor Xuan and Yuan had each sanctioned major offensives against the Xiongnu during their reigns. For the Xiongnu, the situation deteriorated with each setback, leading to erosion of the chanyu's prestige and dominance, and the subsequent internal power struggles further weakened the confederation, fracturing it into various self-ruling factions. The Han dynasty then began adhere to a divide and conquer strategy, using marriage alliances (such as that of Wang Zhaojun to Huhanye) to recruit some against others. After the Eastern Han dynasty was established in 25 AD, the Chinese initially found their hands full after the chaotic civil war and could not afford any full-scale mobilizations against the Xiongnu raids, therefore resorted to continue lobbying among different Xiongnu faction rulers instead. This continued for another two decades until 46 AD, when repeated natural disasters severely weakened the Xiongnu and forced them to flee north from an attack by Wuhuan. Xiongnu then permanently split in 48 AD into two groups, known as the Northern and Southern Xiongnu, respectively. The Southern Xiongnu eventually submitted to the Han Empire and became Han's vassal and auxiliaries/mercenaries against the Northern Xiongnu. An allied force of Han Chinese, Southern Xiongnu, and other pastoral nomadic warriors attacked and defeated the Northern Xiongnu around 100 AD. Following this, the majority of the Northern Xiongnu likewise surrendered to the Han dynasty, albeit some escaped north and west.

=== Control over the Western Regions ===
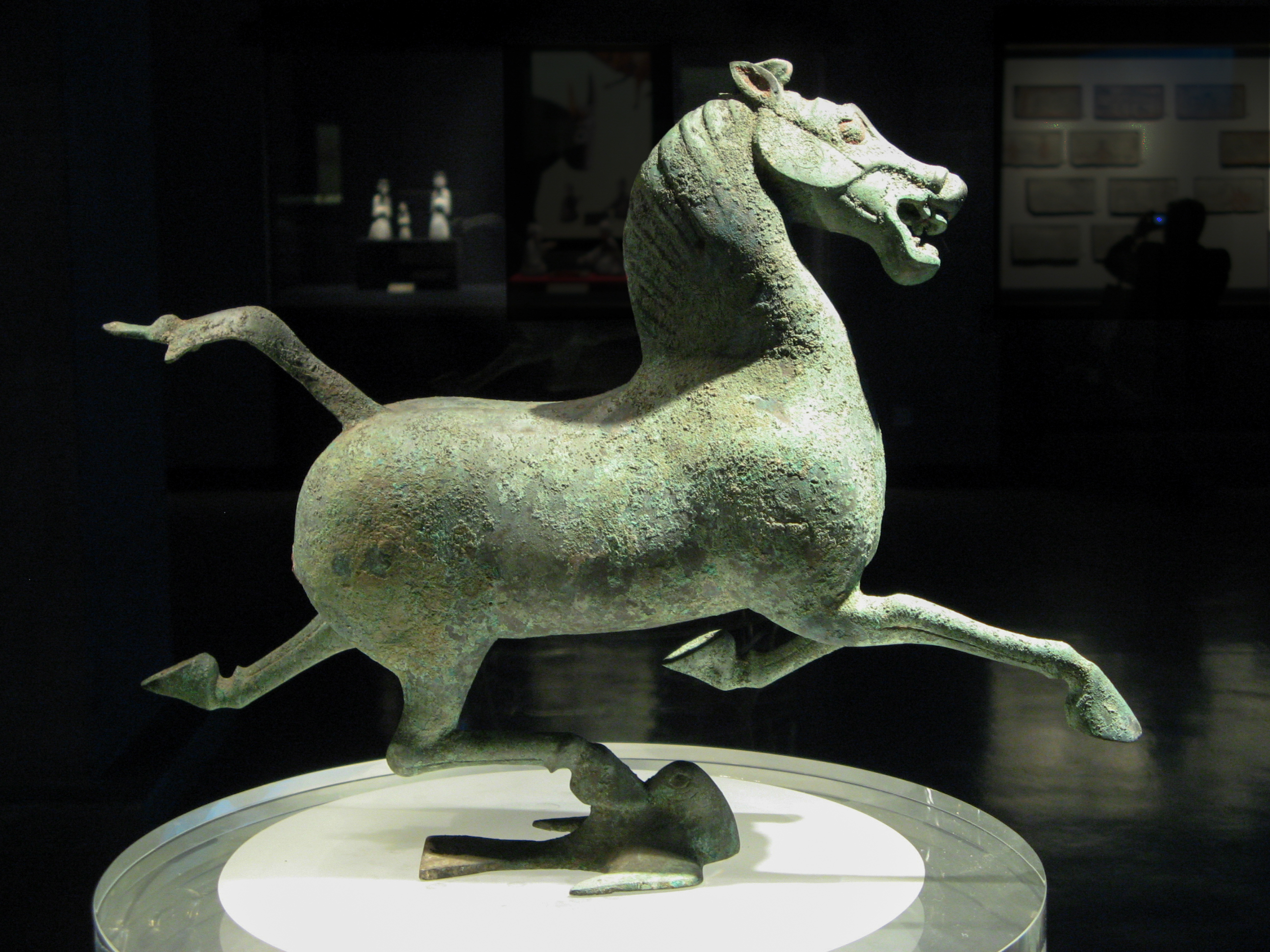
Flying Horse of Gansu (Eastern Han period), representing the famed "celestial" and "blood-sweating" horses that were introduced from Ferghana

The overall strategic Han successes against the Xiongnu allowed the Chinese to project their influence deeply into Central Asia. With the Han conquest of the Hexi Corridor in 121 BC, the city-states at the Tarim Basin were caught in between the onslaught of the war, with much shifting of allegiance. There were several Han military expeditions undertaken to secure the submission of the local kings to the Han empire; the Han took control of the regions for strategic purposes while the Xiongnu needed the regions as a source of revenue. Due to the ensuing war with the Han empire, the Xiongnu were forced to extract more crafts and agricultural foodstuffs from the Tarim Basin urban centres. By 115 BC, the Han had set up commanderies at Jiuquan and Wuwei, while extending the old Qin fortifications from Lingju to the area west of Dunhuang. From 115 to 60 BC, the Han and Xiongnu competed for control and influence over these states, which saw the rise of power of the Han empire over eastern Central Asia with the decline of that of the Xiongnu's. The Han empire brought the states of Loulan, Jushi (Turfan), Luntai (Bügür), Dayuan (Ferghana), and Kangju (Soghdiana) into tributary submission between 108 and 101 BC. The long-walled defence line that now stretched all the way to Dunhuang protected the people, guided caravans and troops to and from Central Asia, and served to separate the Xiongnu from their allies, the Qiang people.

In 115 BC Zhang Qian was once again dispatched to the Western Regions to secure military alliances against the Xiongnu. He sought out the various states in Central Asia, such as the Wusun. He came back without achieving his goals, but he gained valuable knowledge about the Western Regions like in his previous travels. Emperor Wu received reports from Zhang about the large and powerful horses of Ferghana. These horses were known as "heavenly horses" or "blood-sweating horses". Zhang brought back some of these horses to the Han empire. The emperor thought that the horses were of high importance to fight the Xiongnu. The refusal of the Dayuan kingdom, a nation centred in Ferghana, to provide the Han empire with the horses and the execution of a Han envoy led to conflict; the Han forces brought Dayuan into submission in 101 BC. The Xiongnu, aware of this predicament, had tried to halt the Han advance, but they were outnumbered and suffered defeat. The Han dynasty eventually established the Protectorate of the Western Regions in 60 BC to administer the Western Regions in modern-day Xinjiang, with Protector General stationed at Wulei (west of Karasahr, in present Luntai County). After the Western Han dynasty that ended in 9 AD, China lost its authority over the Western Regions until it was restored by the Eastern Han dynasty in 94 AD and officially lasted until 107 AD. After the crackdown of internal separatist forces, the Eastern Han dynasty set up another protectorate known as the Chief Official of the Western Regions instead. The prefectural government of the Western Regions was set up and dismissed for three times during the 200 years of the Eastern Han dynasty.

== See also ==
- Military history of China before 1912
- Military of the Han dynasty
- Protectorate of the Western Regions
- Chief Official of the Western Regions
- Southward expansion of the Han dynasty
- Silk Road
- Tang dynasty in Inner Asia
- Yuan dynasty in Inner Asia
- Ming dynasty in Inner Asia
- Qing dynasty in Inner Asia

== Bibliography ==
- Boulnois, Luce (2004). Silk Road: Monks, Warriors & Merchants on the Silk Road (Translated ed.). Hong Kong: Odyssey. ISBN 978-962-217-720-8.
- Chang, Chun-shu (2007b). The Rise of the Chinese Empire, Volume 2: Frontier, Immigration, & Empire in Han China, 130 B.C. – A.D. 157. Ann Arbor: University of Michigan Press. ISBN 978-0-472-11534-1.
- Cosmo, Nicola Di (2002). Ancient China and its Enemies: The Rise of Nomadic Power in East Asian History. Cambridge: Cambridge University Press. ISBN 0-521-77064-5.
- Golden, Peter B. (2011). Central Asia in World History. Oxford: Oxford University Press. ISBN 978-0-19-515947-9.
- Guo, Xuezhi (2002). The Ideal Chinese Political Leader: A Historical and Cultural Perspective. Westport: Praeger Publishers. ISBN 978-0-275-97259-2.
- Haar, Barend J. ter (2009). Het Hemels Mandaat: De Geschiedenis van het Chinese Keizerrijk (in Dutch). Amsterdam: Amsterdam University Press. ISBN 978-90-8964-120-5.
- Lovell, Julia (2006). The Great Wall: China Against the World, 1000 BC-AD 2000. New York: Grove Press. ISBN 978-0-8021-4297-9.
- Lewis, Mark Edward (2007). The Early Chinese Empires: Qin and Han. Cambridge: Harvard University Press. ISBN 978-0-674-02477-9.
- Loewe, Michael (2009). "The Western Han Army". Military Culture in Imperial China. Cambridge: Harvard University Press. ISBN 978-0-674-03109-8.
- Millward, James A. (1998). Beyond the pass: Economy, Ethnicity, and Empire in Qing Central Asia, 1759-1864. Stanford: Stanford University Press. ISBN 978-0-8047-2933-8.
- Millward, James (2006). Eurasian Crossroads: A History of Xinjiang. New York: Columbia University Press. ISBN 978-0-231-13924-3.
- Yü, Ying-shih (1986). "Han Foreign Relations". The Cambridge History of China, Volume 1: The Ch'in and Han Empires, 221 B.C. - A.D. 220. Cambridge: Cambridge University Press. ISBN 0-521-24327-0.
- Yü, Ying-shih (1994). "The Hsiung-nu". The Cambridge History of Early Inner Asia. Cambridge: Cambridge University Press. ISBN 978-0-521-24304-9.
