= Dou Gu =

Eastern Han general

Dou Gu (Chinese: 竇固; Wade–Giles: Tou Ku; died 88 AD), born in Xianyang, was a Chinese military general during the Eastern Han dynasty who fought in the Battle of Yiwulu in 73. Shortly after the battle, Dou Gu sent two of his generals, Ban Chao and Guo Xun, on a diplomatic expedition to the Western Regions.
