= Zheng Ji (general) =

1st century BC Han dynasty general

Zheng Ji (simplified Chinese: 郑吉; traditional Chinese: 鄭吉; Wade–Giles: Cheng Chi, died 49 BC), born in Shaoxing, Zhejiang, was a general during the Han dynasty, and served the first Protector General of the Western Regions in 60 BC.

== See also ==
- Battle of Jushi
