= Chief Official of the Western Regions =

Chinese military official

- Traditional Chinese: 西域長史
- Simplified Chinese: 西域长史
Transcriptions
Standard Mandarin
- Hanyu Pinyin: Xiyu Changshi
- Wade–Giles: Hsiyu Ch'ang-shih

The chief official of the Western Regions was a Chinese military official in charge of the Western Regions during the Eastern Han, Cao Wei and Jin dynasties.

Since the Eastern Han no longer maintained the post of protector general, the duty was assumed by the chief official in the course of his management of the Western Regions during the period of the Qiang's attacks towards the end of the Eastern Han dynasty in the latter part of the 2nd century CE.

Unlike the protector general of the Western Regions, the chief official (sometimes referred to as the 'chief scribe') did not have a regular office or seat. It corresponded to that of the assistant (郡丞) for the commandery, who received orders from the governor of Dunhuang. So in certain extent, the various statelets of Indo-European in the possession of the chief official would be under the jurisdiction of the governor of Dunhuang.

The first to assume the duty was Ban Chao in 83, and subsequently was Xu Gan (徐干), after Ban became the protector general in 91. The post was roughly equal to the secondary position in support of the protector general. It was later assumed as the protector general in 119 under the impulse of the governor of Dunhuang to disengage the leftover Xiongnu from the Western Regions. Only five of their titles were known: Suo Ban (索班), Ban Yong (班勇), Zhao Ping (赵评), Wang Jing (王敬) and Zhang Yan (张晏). The chief official of the Western Regions was last seen in 175. It was subsequently re-established and maintained by the Cao Wei and the Western Jin until around 328, during the times of Li Bo (李柏), the chief official of the Western Regions in Former Liang.

== See also ==
- Protectorate of the Western Regions
- Han dynasty in Inner Asia
