= Western Regions =

Historical name for regions of Chinese suzerainty in Central Asia

Chinese name
- Chinese: 西域
Transcriptions
Standard Mandarin
- Hanyu Pinyin: Xīyù
- Wade–Giles: Hsi1-yü4
Yue: Cantonese
- Jyutping: sai1 wik6
Middle Chinese
- Middle Chinese: /sei ɦwɨk̚/
Old Chinese
- Zhengzhang: *sɯːl ɢʷrɯɡ

Vietnamese name
- Vietnamese alphabet: tây vực

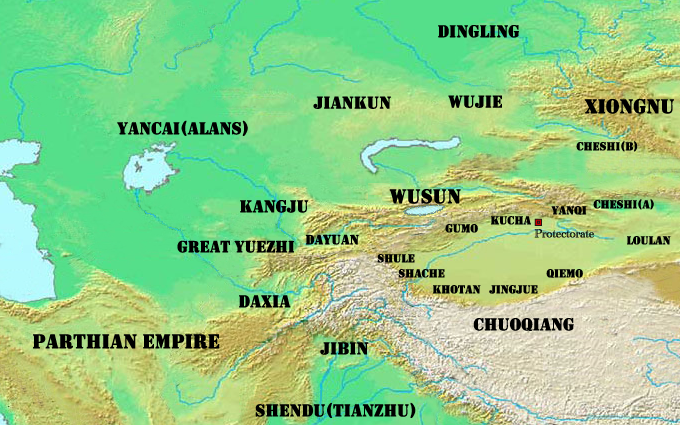
The Western Regions in the first century BC.

The Western Regions, translated from Xiyu (Hsi-yü; Chinese: 西域) and Qixi (Ch'i-hsi; Chinese: 磧西), was a historical name specified in Ancient Chinese chronicles between the 3rd century BC to the 8th century AD that referred to the regions west of the Yumen Pass, most often the Tarim Basin in present-day southern Xinjiang (also known as Altishahr) and Central Asia (specifically the easternmost portion around the Ferghana Valley), though it was sometimes used more generally to refer to other regions to the west of China as well, such as Parthia (which technically belonged to West Asia) and Tianzhu (as in the novel Journey to the West, which refers to the Indian subcontinent in South Asia).

Because of their strategic location astride the Silk Road, the Western Regions have been historically significant to China since at least the 3rd century BC.

== History ==
=== Han dynasty ===
In 138 BC, the Emperor Wu of Western Han dynasty sent a diplomatic envoy represented by Zhang Qian to Xiyu in an effort to contact and make alliance with Yuezhi to mitigate the threat posed by the Xiongnu confederation. Although Zhang was captured and imprisoned by Xiongnu for ten years, and the mission was eventually unsuccessful (due to Yuezhi no longer wanting to return to the east), his travels into the various states in the west served as a precursor for the long history between China and Central Asia. It was the site of the War of the Heavenly Horses between Han China and the Greco-Bactrian Dayuan, and a heavily contested region during the Han–Xiongnu War until 89 AD.

The earliest solid Chinese political control of the region began in 60 BC, when Emperor Xuan of the Western Han dynasty established a military administrative office responsible for what would be present day Xinjiang and parts of Central Asia, known as the Protectorate of the Western Regions. Later, the Eastern Han dynasty set up another protectorate known as the Chief Official of the Western Regions.

=== Tang dynasty ===
Emperor Taizong's campaign against the Western Regions (640–648)

In the 7th century, the Tang dynasty's campaign against the Western Regions led to the re-acquired full control of the region, under the Protectorate General to Pacify the West. The region became significant in later centuries as a cultural conduit between East Asia, the Indian subcontinent, the Muslim world and Europe, including during the period of the Mongol Empire. Some of the most significant exports of the Western Regions were Buddhist texts, particularly the Mahayana sutras, which were carried by traders and pilgrim monks to China. The Tang dynasty monk Xuanzang crossed the region on his way to study in India, resulting in the influential Great Tang Records on the Western Regions upon his return to the Tang capital of Chang'an.

The Chinese lost their influence in the Western Regions after the An Lushan rebellion. A large number of local rulers resumed control in the Western Regions.

=== After Tang dynasty ===
The influence exercised over the Western Regions by later Chinese dynasties varied over time. Xiyu tudi renwu lüe (Brief Records of the Lands and Peoples in the Western Regions), a chapter in the Gazetteer of Shaanxi compiled by Ming dynasty Chinese scholar Ma Li in 1542, documents a route leading from the Jiayu Pass, China's northwestern outpost, to the Ottoman Empire capital Istanbul, and the geography and economy of the places along the route.

In the 19th century, the Russian Empire annexed Central Asia, which then became known as Russian Turkestan; whereas the Inner Asian region of Xinjiang, under the rule of the Qing dynasty, became known as Chinese Turkestan. By the early twentieth century, the Russian Empire (and later, the Soviet Union) controlled most of the regions to the west of Xinjiang.

== Culture ==
Before the onset of Turkic migrations, the peoples of the region spoke two main groups of Indo-European languages. The peoples of oasis city-states of Hotan and Kashgar spoke Saka, one of the Eastern Iranian languages, whereas the people of Kucha, Turpan and Loulan Kingdom spoke the Tocharian languages.

== See also ==
- Turkestan
- Chinese Turkestan
- Chinese Tartary
- Hexi Corridor
- History of the Han dynasty
- Kingdom of Khotan
- Shule Kingdom
- Sogdia
- Han dynasty in Inner Asia
  - Protectorate of the Western Regions
  - Chief Official of the Western Regions
- Tang dynasty in Inner Asia
  - Protectorate General to Pacify the West
- Qing dynasty in Inner Asia
  - Xinjiang under Qing rule
- Ethnic groups in Chinese history
