= Duan Xi =

Last Han dynasty Protector General of the Western Regions

- Allegiance: Han dynasty

Duan Xi (Chinese: 段禧; Wade–Giles: Tuan Hsi, died 110) was the last protector general of the Western Regions during the Han dynasty. He was appointed in 108.

== See also ==
- Battle of Yiwulu
