= Axel Schuessler =

- Born: Axel Schuessler

Academic background
- Education: Ludwig-Maximilians-Universität München

Academic work
- Discipline: Sinology; historical Chinese phonology; Chinese linguistics
- Institutions: Wartburg College

Chinese name
- Traditional Chinese: 許思萊
- Simplified Chinese: 许思莱
Transcriptions
Standard Mandarin
- Hanyu Pinyin: Xǔ Sīlái

Axel Schuessler is a German sinologist and linguist, and Emeritus Professor at Wartburg College, Iowa, USA, known for his pioneering work in Old Chinese etymology and historical Chinese phonology.

== Career ==
Axel Schuessler has conducted research and taught in Sinology and historical Chinese linguistics for several decades. He served on the faculty of Wartburg College in Waverly, Iowa, where he became Professor of Chinese and linguistics and is now Emeritus Professor. His work has focused especially on the reconstruction of Old Chinese.

Schuessler’s ABC dictionary is widely regarded as a landmark in Old Chinese studies, serving as a benchmark for further research into the origins and phonological development of Chinese vocabulary.

== Old Chinese Reconstruction Categories ==
=== Minimal Old Chinese (OCM) ===
The term “Minimal Old Chinese” refers to reconstructions limited to phonological features with reasonable consensus among scholars after Karlgren, chiefly following Baxter (1992) with adjustments in notation. Schuessler compiles reconstructed forms for graphs attested from early writing (circa 1250 BCE) down to the third century BCE.

=== Later Han Chinese ===
In addition to Old Chinese, Schuessler introduces an intermediate layer he terms “Later Han Chinese,” covering roughly the second century CE, between Old and Middle Chinese periods.

== Selected works ==
- Schuessler, Axel (1966). Das Yüe-chüe shu als hanzeitliche Quelle zur Geschichte der Chan-kuo-Zeit (Ph.D. dissertation). Ludwig-Maximilians-Universität München.
- Schuessler, Axel (1976). Affixes in Proto-Chinese. Wiesbaden: Franz Steiner Verlag. ISBN 9783515025652.
- Schuessler, Axel (1987). A Dictionary of Early Zhou Chinese. Honolulu: University of Hawaiʻi Press. ISBN 9780824811112.
- Schuessler, Axel (2003). "Multiple Origins of the Old Chinese Lexicon". Journal of Chinese Linguistics. 31 (1): 1–71.
- Schuessler, Axel (2007). ABC Etymological Dictionary of Old Chinese. Honolulu: University of Hawaiʻi Press. ISBN 9780824829759.
- Schuessler, Axel (2009). Minimal Old Chinese and Later Han Chinese: A Companion to Grammata Serica Recensa. Honolulu: University of Hawaiʻi Press. ISBN 9780824832643.

== See also ==
- Old Chinese phonology
- Bernard Karlgren
- Historical Chinese phonology
