= Guo Xun =

1st century AD Chinese general

Guo Xun (Chinese: 郭恂; Wade–Giles: Kuo Hsün, d. 75) was a military officer under the Han dynasty of China. He was an associate general of Ban Chao, as he and Ban Chao were sent to the Western Regions for a diplomatic expedition by Dou Gu. In 75, he was killed along with Chen Mu by the rebels from the state of Yanqi and Qiuci.
