= Li Chong (general) =

Li Chong (Chinese: 李崇; Wade–Giles: Li Ch'ung), was the last Protector General of the Western Regions prior to Eastern Han between 16 and 23 CE. One of his official seals with his name written as 李崇之印信 was excavated in 1928 from Aksu.
