= Chen Mu =

1st century AD Han dynasty general and governor

Chen Mu (Chinese: 陈睦; Wade–Giles: Ch'en Mu, d. 75) was a governor and general during the Han dynasty who served the first Protector General of the Western Regions under Eastern Han between 74 and 75. During his service, he was killed by the rebels in Karasahr in A.D. 75, during the Han-Xiongnu War.

== See also ==
- Battle of Yiwulu
