= Dayuan =

Chinese exonym for a Central Asian state

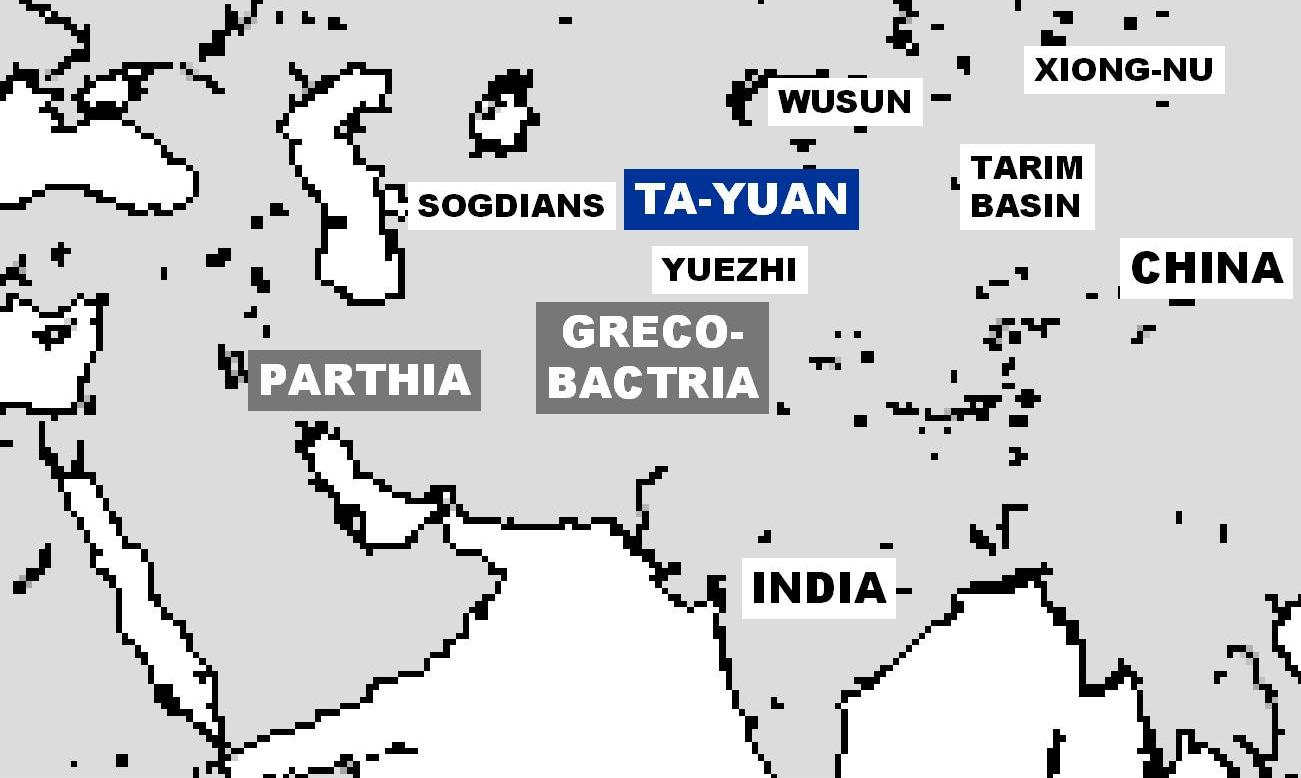
The Dayuan (in Ferghana) was one of the three advanced civilizations of Central Asia around 130 BCE, together with Parthia and Greco-Bactria, according to the Chinese historical work Book of Han.

Dayuan (or Tayuan; Chinese: 大宛; pinyin: Dàyuān; lit. 'Great Ionians'; Middle Chinese dâi^{C}-jwɐn < LHC: dɑh-ʔyɑn) is the Chinese exonym for a country that existed in Ferghana valley in Central Asia, described in the Chinese historical works of Records of the Grand Historian and the Book of Han. It is mentioned in the accounts of the Chinese explorer Zhang Qian in 130 BCE and the numerous embassies that followed him into Central Asia. The country of Dayuan is generally accepted as relating to the Ferghana Valley, controlled by the Hellenistic city-state Alexandria Eschate (modern Khujand, Tajikistan), which can probably be understood as "Greco-Fergana city-state" in the English language.

These Chinese accounts describe the "Dayuan" as urbanized dwellers with European phenotypes, living in walled cities and having "customs identical to those of the Daxia" or Greco-Bactrians, a Hellenistic kingdom that was ruling Bactria at that time in today's northern Afghanistan. It is very likely that the Dayuan formed the northern part of the Greco-Bactrian Kingdom. The Dayuan are also described as manufacturers and great lovers of wine.

The Dayuan were the descendants of Greeks forcibly resettled in the area by the Persian Empire, as well as the subsequent Greek colonists that were settled by Alexander the Great in Ferghana in 329 BCE (see Alexandria Eschate), and had prospered within the Hellenistic realm of the Seleucids and Greco-Bactrians, until they were isolated by the migrations of the Yuezhi around 160 BCE and the Scythians in 140. It appears that the name "Yuan" was simply a transliteration of Sanskrit Yavana or Pali Yona, used in Asia to designate Greeks ("Ionians"), so Dayuan meant "Great Ionians".

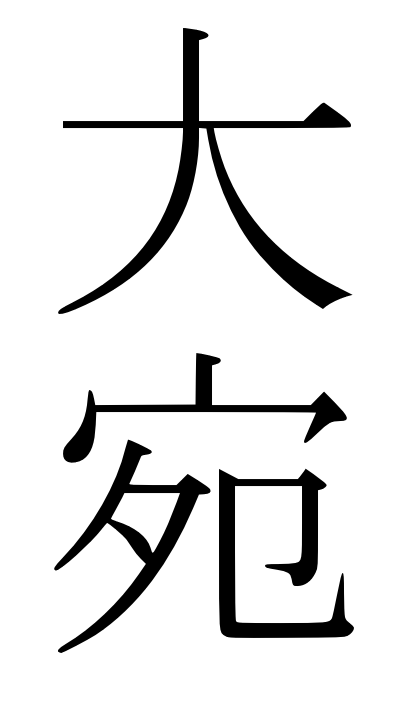
Characters for Dayuan, associating the character for "Great", and a character originally depicting two persons seated under one roof, but used for its sound value here. It is pronounced "yuān" instead of the more usual "wǎn".

By 100 BC, the Dayuan were attacked and then defeated by the Han dynasty in the Han-Dayuan war. The interaction between the Dayuan and the Chinese is historically crucial, since it represents one of the first major contacts between an urbanized civilization in Central Asia and the Chinese civilization, opening the way to the formation of the Silk Road that was to link the East and the West in material and cultural exchange from the 1st century BCE to the 15th century.

== History ==
=== Persia ===
This region was ruled over by Persia starting with Xerxes I, and began to be populated by Greeks starting at this time. When Greeks in other parts of the Persian empire rebelled or otherwise were troublesome, they would be exiled to Sogdia in the far northeast of the Persian empire, the most distant segment from their homelands. The largest city in this northeastern outpost of the Persian empire was known to the Greeks as Cyropolis, after the Persian emperor Cyrus the Great. By the time of the fall of Persia to Alexander the Great, Greek villages, language, and culture were therefore all common in this area.

=== Hellenistic rule (329–160 BCE) ===
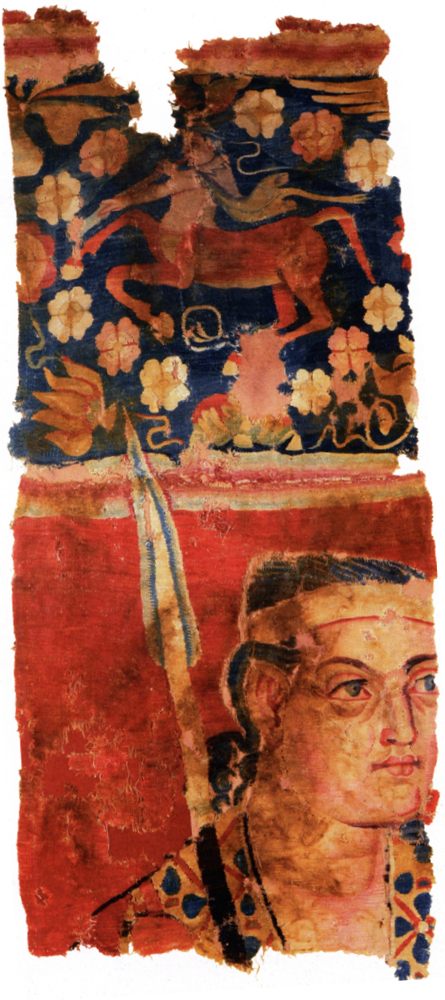
Probable Greek soldier (maybe king according to royal headband), woolen wall hanging, Sampul tapestry, 3rd–2nd century BCE, Sampul, Urumqi Xinjiang Museum.

The region of Ferghana was conquered by Alexander the Great in 329 BCE and became his most advanced base in Central Asia. He founded (probably by occupying and renaming Cyropolis) the fortified city of Alexandria Eschate (Lit. "Alexandria the Furthest") in the southwestern part of the Ferghana valley, on the southern bank of the river Syr Darya (ancient Jaxartes), at the location of the modern city of Khujand (also called Khozdent, formerly Leninabad), in the state of Tajikistan. Alexander built a 6 kilometer long brick wall around the city and, as similarly in the cases of the other cities he founded, had a garrison of his retired veterans and wounded settle there.

The whole of Bactria, Transoxiana and the area of Ferghana remained under the control of the Hellenistic Seleucid Empire until 250 BCE. The region then wrested independence under the leadership of its Greek governors Diodotus I of Bactria, to become the Greco-Bactrian Kingdom.

=== Greco-Bactrian kingdom (250–160 BCE) ===
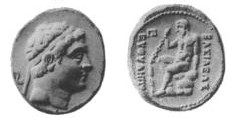
The Greco-Bactrian king Euthydemus I (230–200 BCE)

The Greco-Bactrians held their territory, and according to the Greek historian Strabo even went beyond Alexandria Eschate and "extended their empire as far as the Serica and the Phryni" (Strabo XI.XI.I). There are indications that they may have led expeditions as far as Kashgar in Xinjiang, leading to the first known contacts between China and the West around 200 BCE. Various statuettes and representations of Greek soldiers have been found north of the Tien Shan, and are today on display in the museum of Urumqi (Boardman). King Euthydemus I originally ruled in Sogdia and the area of the Dayuan, before overthrowing the dynasty of Diodotus in Bactria.

Around 160 BCE, the area of Ferghana seems to have been invaded by Saka tribes (called the Sai-Wang by the Chinese). The Sai-Wang, originally settled in the Ili valley in the general area of Lake Issyk Kul, were retreating southward after having been dislodged by Yuezhi (who themselves were fleeing from the Xiongnu):

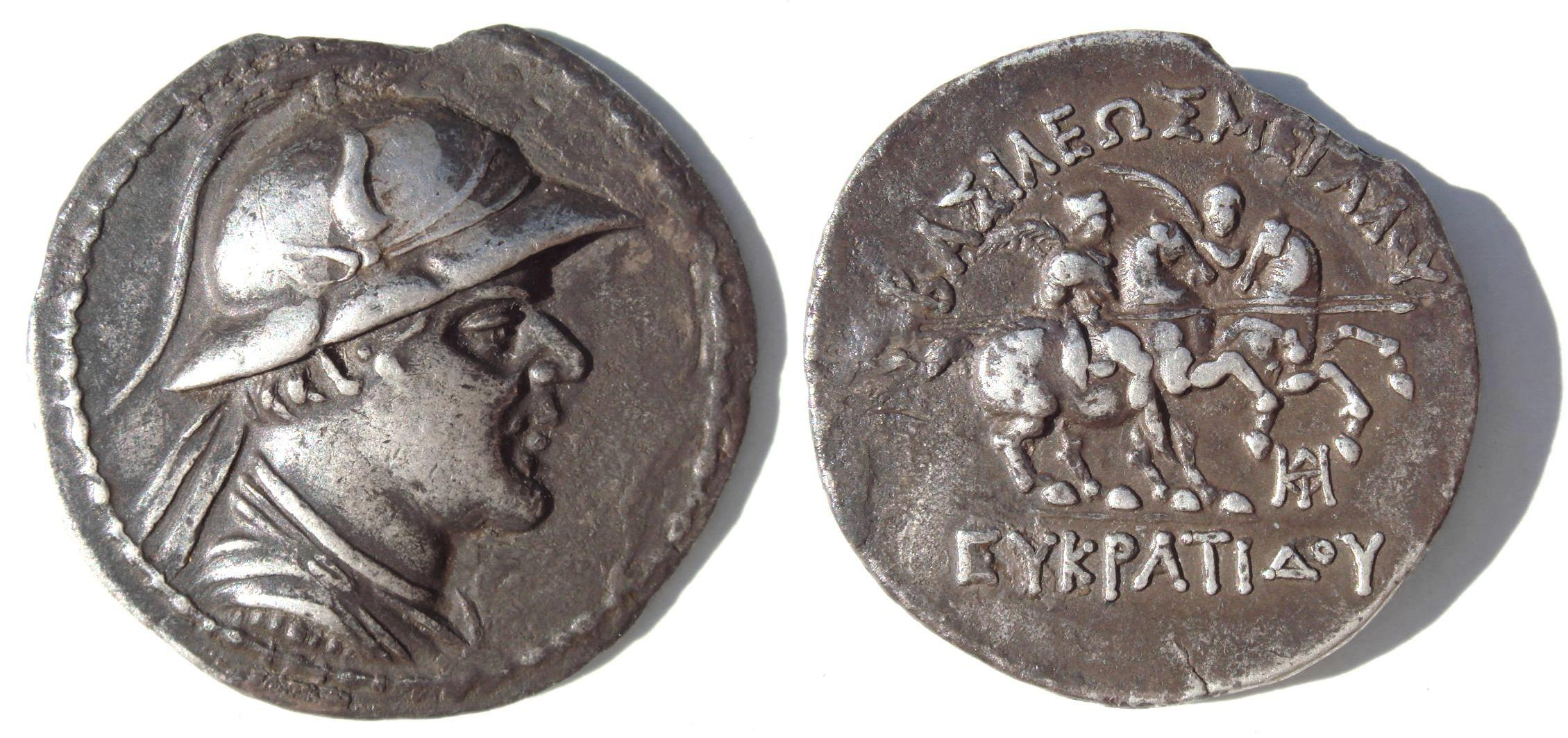
Silver tetradrachm of King Eucratides I, who probably lost the territory of Ferghana to the Sakas.

The Yuezhi attacked the king of the Sai ("Sai-Wang") who moved a considerable distance to the south and the Yuezhi then occupied his lands

— Han Shu, 61 4B.

The Sakas occupied the Greek territory of Dayuan, benefiting from the fact that the Greco-Bactrians were fully occupied with conflicts in India against the Indo-Greeks, and could hardly defend their northern provinces. According to W. W. Tarn,

The remaining of the Sai-Wang tribes apparently seized the Greek province of Ferghana… It was easy at this time to occupy Ferghana: Eucratides had just overthrown the Euthydemid dynasty, he himself was with his army in India, and in 159 he met his death… Heliocles, preoccupied first with the recovery of Bactria and then with the invasion of India, must have let this outlying province go

— W. W. Tarn, The Greeks in Bactria and India.

=== Saka rule ===
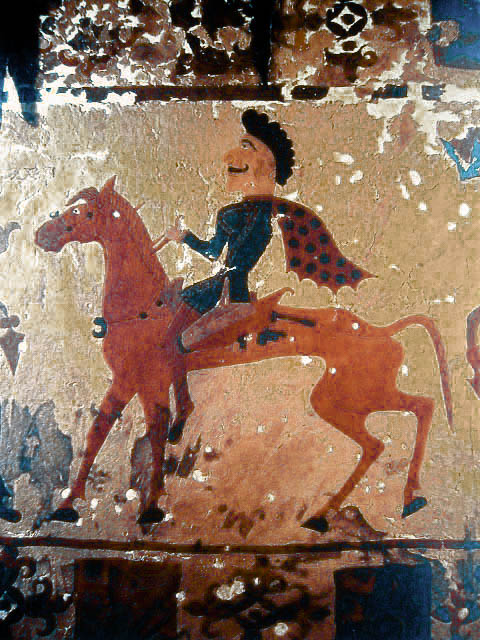
A Saka (Scythian) horseman from the area north of the Tian Shan, Pazyryk, c.300 BCE.

The Saka rule of Dayuan possibly started in 160 BCE. When the Chinese explorer Zhang Qian described Dayuan around 128 BCE, he mentioned, besides the flourishing urbanized civilization, there were warriors "shooting arrows on horseback", a probable description of nomadic horse archers that were typical of the steppe civilizations at the time, of which Saka was one. Dayuan had probably by then become a kingdom of militaristic Saka ruling class exacting taxes and tributes from the local Hellenistic population.

Also in 106–101 BCE, during their conflict with China, the country of Dayuan is said to have been an ally with the neighbouring tribes of Kangju (probably Sodgia). The Chinese also record the name of the king of Dayuan as "Mu-Kua", a Saka name rendered in Greek as Mauakes or Maues. Another Scythian ruler by the name of Maues was later a ruler of the Indo-Scythian kingdom in northern India, during the 1st century BCE.

=== Yuezhi migration ===
According to the Han Chronicles In 132BCE the Yuezhi were driven out of the Ili River valley by the Wusun. They fled south from the Ili river area, by-passed the urban civilization of the Dayuan in Ferghana, and re-settled north of the Oxus in Bactria, definitively cutting Dayuan from contact with the Greco-Bactrian kingdom. The Yuezhi would further expand southward into Bactria proper around 125 BCE, and then going on to form the Kushan Empire in the 1st century CE.

=== Han Chinese rule and interaction ===
The Dayuan remained a healthy and powerful civilization which had numerous contacts and exchanges with China from 130 BCE.

==== Zhang Qian's Report ====
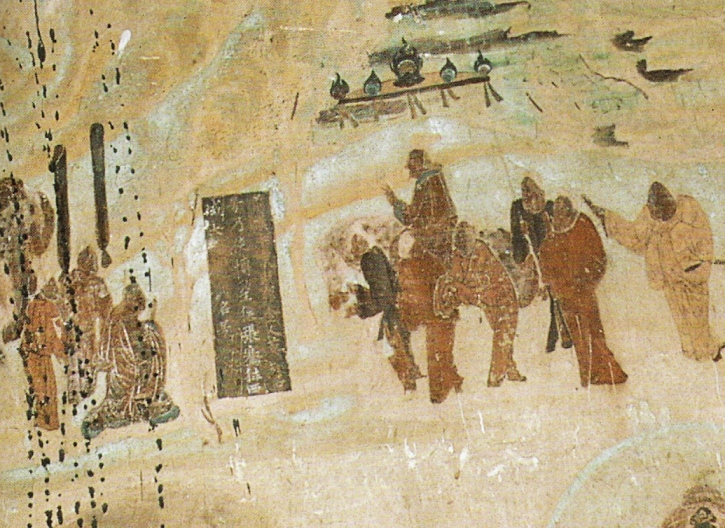
Zhang Qian leaving emperor Han Wudi, for his expedition to Central Asia from 138 to 126 BCE, Mogao Caves mural, 618–712 CE.

Around 130 BCE, at the time of Zhang Qian's embassy to Central Asia, the Dayuan were described as inhabitants of a region corresponding to the Ferghana, far to the west of the Chinese empire.

The capital of the kingdom of Dayuan is the city of Guishan (Khujand), distant from Chang'an 12,550 li (Shiji,123 calls the capital Ershi). The kingdom contains 60,000 families, comprising a population of 300,000, with 60,000 trained troops, a Viceroy, and a National Assistant Prince. The seat of the Governor General lies to the east at a distance of 4,031 li.

— Han Shu

To their south-west were the territories of the Yuezhi, with the Greco-Bactrians further south still, beyond the Oxus.

The great Yueh-chih is situated about 2000 or 3000 li west of Dayuan; they dwell north of the river Kuei (Oxus). To the south of them there is Daxia (Bactrians), to the west, Anxis (Parthians); to the north Kangju (Sogdians).

— Shiji, 123.5b

The Shiji then explains that the Yuezhi originally inhabited the Hexi Corridor, before they were defeated by the Xiongnu under Mao-tun and later his son in 176 BCE, forcing them to go beyond the territory of the Dayuan and resettle in the West by the banks of the Oxus, between the territory of the Dayuan and Bactria to the south.

==== Urbanized city-dwellers ====
The customs of the Dayuan are said by Zhang Qian to be identical to those of the Bactrians in the south, who actually formed the Greco-Bactrian Kingdom at that time.

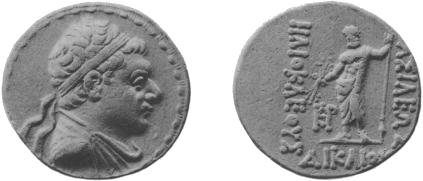
Silver coin of the Greco-Bactrian king Heliocles I (150–125 BCE) at the time of Zhang Qian's embassy.

Their customs (the Bactrians) are the same as those of Dayuan. The people have fixed abodes and live in walled cities and regular houses like the people of Dayuan. They have no great kings or heads, but everywhere in their walled cities and settlements they have installed small kings.

— Shiji, 123.3b

They are described as town-dwellers, as opposed to other populations such as the Yuezhi, the Wusun or the Xiongnu who were nomads.

They have walled cities and houses; the large and small cities belonging to them, fully seventy in number, contain an aggregate population of several hundreds of thousands…There are more than seventy other cities in the country.

— Han Shu

==== Appearance and Culture ====
The Shiji comments on the appearance and the culture of the people around Dayuan:

Although the states from Dayuan west to Anxi speak rather different languages, their customs are generally similar and their languages mutually intelligible. The men all have deep-set eyes and profuse beards and whiskers. They are skillful at commerce and will haggle over a fraction of a cent. Women are held in great respect, and the men make decisions on the advice of their women.

They were manufacturers and lovers of wine:

Round about Dayuan they make wine from grapes. Wealthy people store up as much as 10,000 stones and over in their cellars, and keep it for several tens of years without spoiling. The people are fond of wine.

— Shiji, 123

According to the Shiji, grapes and alfalfa were introduced to China from Dayuan following Zhang Qian's embassy:

The regions around Dayuan make wine out of grapes, the wealthier inhabitants keeping as much as 10,000 or more piculs stored away. It can be kept for as long as twenty or thirty years without spoiling. The people love their wine and the horses love their alfalfa. The Han envoys brought back grape and alfalfa seeds to China and the emperor for the first time tried growing these plants in areas of rich soil. Later, when the Han acquired large numbers of the "heavenly horses" and the envoys from foreign states began to arrive with their retinues, the lands on all sides of the emperor's summer palaces and pleasure towers were planted with grapes and alfalfa for as far as the eye could see.

The Shiji also claims that metal casting was introduced to the Dayuan region by Han deserters:

... the casting of coins and vessels was formerly unknown. Later, however, when some of the Chinese soldiers attached to the Han embassies ran away and surrendered to the people of the area, they taught them how to cast metal and manufacture weapons.

==== Han-Dayuan war ====
Following the reports of Zhang Qian (who was originally sent to obtain an alliance with the Yuezhi against the Xiongnu, in vain), the Chinese emperor Wudi became interested in developing commercial relationships with the sophisticated urban civilizations of Ferghana, Bactria and Parthia: "The Son of Heaven on hearing all this reasoned thus: Ferghana (Dayuan) and the possessions of Bactria and Parthia are large countries, full of rare things, with a population living in fixed abodes and given to occupations somewhat identical with those of the Chinese people, but with weak armies, and placing great value on the rich produce of China" (Shiji, 123)

The Chinese subsequently sent numerous embassies, around ten every year, to these countries and as far as Seleucid Syria."Thus more embassies were dispatched to An-si (Parthia), An-ts'ai (the Aorsi, or Alans), Li-kan (Syria under the Seleucids), T'iau-chi (Chaldea), and Shon-tu (India)... As a rule, rather more than ten such missions went forward in the course of a year, and at the least five or six." (Shiji, 123)

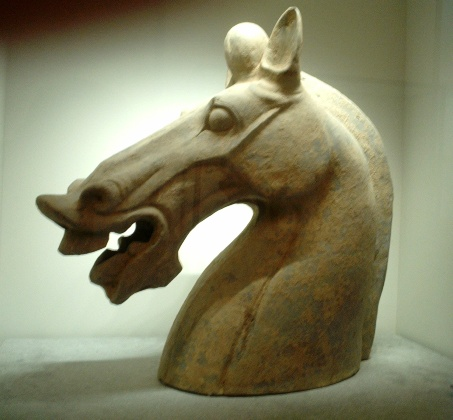
Fragment of a terracotta horse sculpture of the Later Han dynasty (1st–2nd century AD/CE)

The Chinese were also strongly attracted by the tall and powerful horses ("heavenly horses") in the possession of the Dayuan, which were of capital importance to fight the nomadic Xiongnu. The refusal of the Dayuan to offer them enough horses along with a series of conflicts and mutual disrespect resulted in the death of the Chinese ambassador and the confiscation of the gold sent as payment for the horses.

Enraged, and thinking Dayuan weak, the Chinese Emperor in 104 BCE sent out Li Guangli, the brother of his favorite concubine. He was given 6,000 horsemen and '30,000 young men of bad reputation rounded up from the provinces'. General Li lost many men along the way in petty fights with local rulers. After a severe defeat at a place called Yucheng Li concluded that he was not strong enough to take the enemy capital and therefore returned to Dunhuang (about 102 BCE).

Emperor Wudi responded by giving Li Guangli a much larger army along with a huge number of oxen, donkeys and camels to carry supplies. With this force he had no difficulty reaching Ershi, the Dayuan capital. After a 40-day siege the Chinese had broken through the outer wall and cut off the water supply. The nobles of Ershi killed their king and sent his head to Li Guangli, offering the Chinese all the horses they wanted. Li accepted the offer, appointed one of the nobles to be the new king and withdrew with the horses. On his return journey all the petty states accepted Chinese sovereignty. He reached the Jade Gate about 100 BCE with 10,000 men and 1,000 horses.

Contacts with the West were re-established following the peace treaty with the Yuan. Ambassadors were once again sent to the West, caravans were sent to Bactria.

=== Era of East-West trade and cultural exchange ===
The Silk Road essentially came into being from the 1st century BCE, following the efforts of China to consolidate a road to the Western world, both through direct settlements in the area of the Tarim Basin and diplomatic relations with Dayuan, Parthians and Bactrians further west.

Intense trade followed soon, confirmed by the Roman craze for Chinese silk (supplied by the Parthians) from the 1st century BCE, to the point that the Senate issued, in vain, several edicts to prohibit the wearing of silk, on economic and moral grounds. This is attested by at least three significant authors:

- Strabo (64/ 63 BCE–c. 24 CE).
- Seneca the Younger (c. 3 BCE–65 CE).
- Pliny the Elder (23–79 CE).

This is also the time when the Buddhist faith and the Greco-Buddhist culture started to travel along the Silk Road, entering China from around the 1st century BCE.

== See also ==
- History of Buddhism
- Greco-Buddhism
