= Luntai County =

Luntai County 轮台县 (Chinese) بۈگۈر ناھىيىسى (Uyghur) ᠪᠦᠭᠦᠷ ᠰᠢᠶᠠᠨ (Mongolian) Bugur County
- County
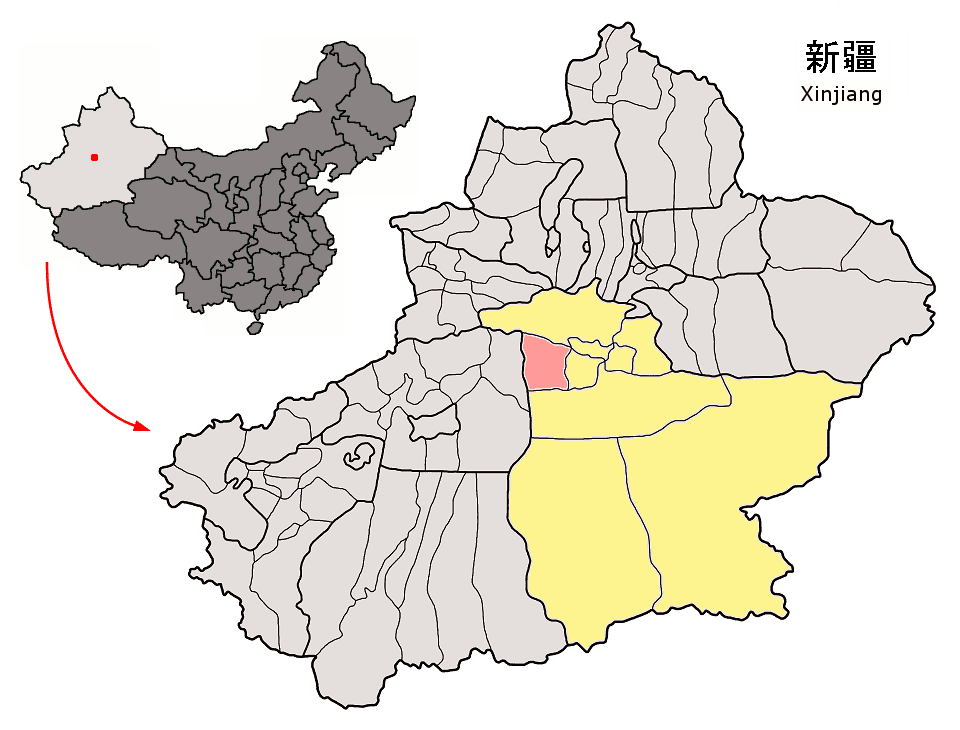
- Location of Luntai County (red) within Bayingolin Prefecture (yellow) and Xinjiang

- Location of the seat in Xinjiang Luntai (Xinjiang) Luntai (China)
- Coordinates: 41°46′N 84°10′E
- Country: China
- Autonomous region: Xinjiang
- Autonomous prefecture: Bayingolin
- County seat: Luntai Town (Bügür)

Area
  - Total: 14,181.7 km^{2} (5,475.6 sq mi)

Population (2020)
  - Total: 137,327
  - Density: 9.68339/km^{2} (25.0799/sq mi)
- Time zone: UTC+8 (China Standard (Note: Locals in Xinjiang frequently observe UTC+6 (Xinjiang Time), 2 hours behind Beijing.))
- Website: www.xjlt.gov.cn

Luntai County

Chinese name
- Simplified Chinese: 轮台县
- Traditional Chinese: 輪台縣
Transcriptions
Standard Mandarin
- Hanyu Pinyin: Lúntái Xiàn

Alternative Chinese name
- Simplified Chinese: 布古尔县
- Traditional Chinese: 布古爾縣
Transcriptions
Standard Mandarin
- Hanyu Pinyin: Bùgǔ'ěr Xiàn

Mongolian name
- Mongolian script: ᠪᠦᠭᠦᠷ ᠰᠢᠶᠠᠨ

Uyghur name
- Uyghur: بۈگۈر ناھىيىسى
Transcriptions
- Latin Yëziqi: Bügür Nahiyisi
- Yengi Yeziⱪ: Bügür Naⱨiyisi
- SASM/GNC: Bügür Nahiyisi
- Siril Yëziqi: Бүгүр наһийиси

Luntai County, also known as Bugur County or Bügür County (transliterated from Mongolian), is a county in central Xinjiang Uyghur Autonomous Region under the administration of the Bayin'gholin Mongol Autonomous Prefecture. It contains an area of 14,189 km^{2} (5,478 sq mi). According to the 2002 census, it has a population of 90,000.

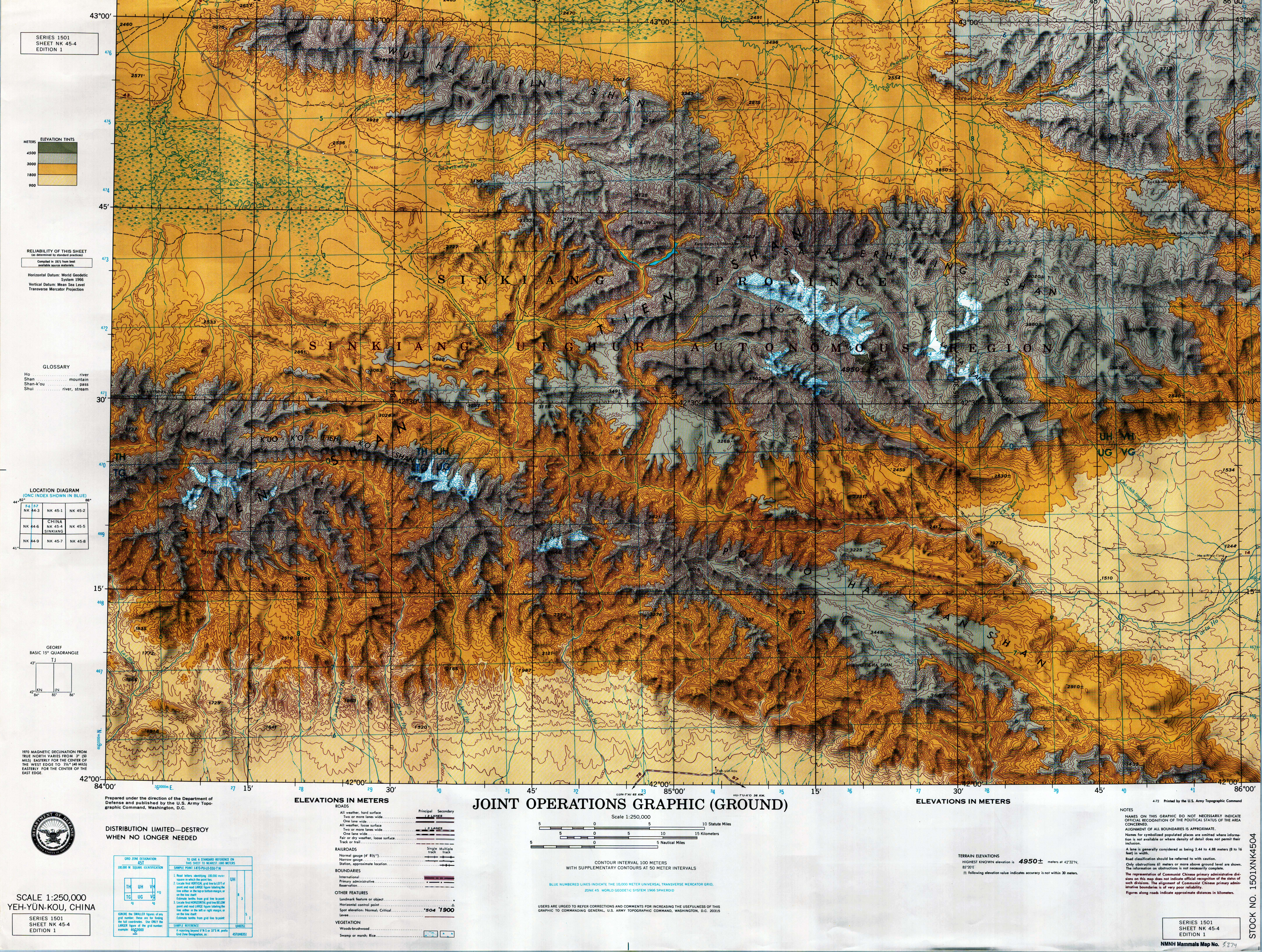
Map including northern part of the county (ATC, 1972)

Luntai has a long history. When the city refused aid to Li Guangli's Fergana campaign (c. 101 BC), the inhabitants were slaughtered. Around 80 BC, a military colony of the Han dynasty was established on the site. In 60 BC, the Han dynasty established the Protectorate of the Western Regions, with the Protector General stationed in Wulei in present Luntai County.

As of 1885, there was about 25,100 acres (165,700 mu) of cultivated land in Bugur.

== Demographics ==
The proportion of nationalities in Luntai (Bügür) County
Nationality	Percentage
Uyghurs	82.5%
Han	17.0%
Hui	0.3%
Others	0.2%
Source of the population statistics :

== Administrative divisions ==
Luntai County includes 4 towns and 7 townships.

Name	Simplified Chinese	Hanyu Pinyin	Uyghur (UEY)	Uyghur Latin (ULY)	Mongolian (traditional)	Mongolian (Cyrillic)	Administrative division code
Towns
Luntai Town	轮台镇	Lúntái Zhèn	بۈگۈر بازىرى	bügür baziri			652822100
Lunnan Town	轮南镇	Lúnnán Zhèn	جەنۇبىي بۈگۈر بازىرى	jenubiy bügür baziri			652822101
Qumpak Town	群巴克镇	Qúnbākè Zhèn	چۇمپاق بازىرى	chumpaq baziri			652822102
Yengisar Town	阳霞镇	Yángxiá Zhèn	يېڭىسار بازىرى	yëngisar baziri			652822103
Townships
Karabag Township	哈尔巴克乡	Hā'ěrbākè Xiāng	قارىباغ يېزىسى	qaribagh yëzisi			652822201
Yeyungou Township (Eshme Township)	野云沟乡	Yěyúngōu Xiāng	ئەشمە يېزىسى	Eshme yëzisi			652822202
Aksaray Township	阿克萨来乡	Ākèsàlái Xiāng	ئاقساراي يېزىسى	Aqsaray yëzisi			652822203
Tarlak Township	塔尔拉克乡	Tǎ'ěrlākè Xiāng	تارلاق يېزىسى	tarlaq yëzisi			652822204
Caohu Township	草湖乡	Cǎohú Xiāng	سوخۇ يېزىسى	soxu yëzisi			652822205
Terakbazar Township	铁热克巴扎乡	Tiěrèkèbāzhā Xiāng	تېرەكبازار يېزىسى	tërekbazar yëzisi			652822206
Qedir Township	策达雅乡	Cèdáyǎ Xiāng	چېدىر يېزىسى	chëdir yëzisi			652822207

== Climate ==
Climate data for Luntai, elevation 982 m (3,222 ft), (1991–2020 normals, extremes 1991–present)
Month	Jan	Feb	Mar	Apr	May	Jun	Jul	Aug	Sep	Oct	Nov	Dec	Year
Record high °C (°F)	8.0 (46.4)	16.2 (61.2)	27.4 (81.3)	36.1 (97.0)	36.7 (98.1)	38.7 (101.7)	42.5 (108.5)	40.2 (104.4)	38.1 (100.6)	29.9 (85.8)	20.5 (68.9)	9.1 (48.4)	42.5 (108.5)
Mean daily maximum °C (°F)	−1.5 (29.3)	5.9 (42.6)	15.0 (59.0)	23.4 (74.1)	28.4 (83.1)	32.1 (89.8)	33.8 (92.8)	32.7 (90.9)	27.9 (82.2)	20.1 (68.2)	9.8 (49.6)	0.2 (32.4)	19.0 (66.2)
Daily mean °C (°F)	−7.8 (18.0)	−1.0 (30.2)	7.9 (46.2)	16.1 (61.0)	21.2 (70.2)	25.0 (77.0)	26.5 (79.7)	25.4 (77.7)	20.4 (68.7)	11.9 (53.4)	2.7 (36.9)	−5.4 (22.3)	11.9 (53.4)
Mean daily minimum °C (°F)	−12.7 (9.1)	−6.8 (19.8)	1.5 (34.7)	9.2 (48.6)	14.4 (57.9)	18.3 (64.9)	19.9 (67.8)	18.8 (65.8)	13.7 (56.7)	5.5 (41.9)	−2.6 (27.3)	−9.6 (14.7)	5.8 (42.4)
Record low °C (°F)	−25.6 (−14.1)	−22.0 (−7.6)	−10.3 (13.5)	−3.6 (25.5)	2.6 (36.7)	8.1 (46.6)	11.3 (52.3)	7.9 (46.2)	4.2 (39.6)	−3.6 (25.5)	−11.8 (10.8)	−22.9 (−9.2)	−25.6 (−14.1)
Average precipitation mm (inches)	1.4 (0.06)	1.9 (0.07)	1.6 (0.06)	4.0 (0.16)	7.5 (0.30)	15.3 (0.60)	12.8 (0.50)	11.5 (0.45)	4.9 (0.19)	2.5 (0.10)	3.8 (0.15)	1.7 (0.07)	68.9 (2.71)
Average precipitation days (≥ 0.1 mm)	2.0	1.2	0.9	1.6	3.0	5.2	6.2	5.0	2.7	1.2	1.0	1.8	31.8
Average snowy days	5.4	2.0	0.3	0.1	0	0	0	0	0	0.1	1.2	4.8	13.9
Average relative humidity (%)	69	57	39	31	32	37	40	41	44	50	59	71	48
Mean monthly sunshine hours	155.1	174.2	197.7	221.8	255.6	254.4	271.7	261.2	246.6	236.5	185.6	141.6	2,602
Percentage possible sunshine	52	57	53	55	56	56	60	62	67	70	64	50	59
Source: China Meteorological Administration all-time record highall-time September high
