= Nancy Lee Swann =

American Sinologist (1881–1966)

Nancy Lee Swann (b. 9 Feb 1881 Tyler, Texas; d. 15 May 1966 El Paso, Texas) was an American Sinologist and curator of the Gest Memorial Chinese Library at Princeton University from 1931 until her retirement in 1948. Her best known scholarly publication were Pan Chao: Foremost Woman Scholar of China, published by the American Historical Association in 1932 and Food and Money in Ancient China, an annotated scholarly translation of the economic chapters of the Han Shu, published by Princeton University Press in 1950.

Swann was likely the first woman to receive a PhD in Chinese history in the United States.

== Education and early career ==
Swann first studied at Sam Houston State Teachers College, taught school for four years, then returned to school. to graduate in June 1906, with a Bachelor of Arts degree from University of Texas, Austin, Phi Beta Kappa, She served for seven years as a Baptist missionary and Y.W.C.A. Secretary in Jinan, Shandong. She returned to the United States and entered graduate study at Columbia University, but went again to China to study at North China Union Language School in Peking.

== Gest Memorial Collection ==
In 1928 Swann joined the library at McGill University, in Montréal, then home of what would become the Gest Oriental Collection. Guion Moore Gest (1864-1948) (pronounced "Guest") had travelled often to Asia in the 1910s and 1920s on business for the Gest Engineering Company, which he founded and headed. He developed a fascination with Chinese medicine and traditional culture, and began to amass a collection of rare or significant Chinese books. On one of his trips to Peking, Gest met Commander I.V. (Irvin Van Gorder) Gillis (1875-1948), a naval attaché, who became his agent.

In 1931, Swann both received her doctorate from Columbia University and became curator of the Gest Collection, a position she continued to hold until her retirement in 1948. In the 1930s, Gillis continued to buy Chinese books in Peking even though Gest could not always pay for them, and Swann continued her responsibilities as curator and guide to the collection even though Gest could not always provide her salary. McGill found itself unable to continue its support or offer space on campus. The Collection was bought by the Institute for Advanced Study in Princeton, New Jersey in 1937.

At the start of its responsibility for the collection, the Institute for Advanced Study did not have staff with a competence in Chinese, and the University did not have a department in Chinese studies. Because of Gest's continued financial problems, Swann went for two years without salary. She continued to build the collection, which was housed in what she called "makeshift quarters," in the basement of a commercial building on Nassau Street, where it got little use. At one point, she put down a pail and floor protection when a summer storm caused a leak in the roof.

In January 1948, Swann was one of the fourteen scholars at the organizational meeting of the Association for Asian Studies, and the only woman.

== Scholarly contributions ==
Swann also pursued an active publishing career. Her first book was a study of the Han dynasty scholar Ban Zhao, whom she called "the foremost woman scholar of China," who composed roughly a fourth of Han Shu, traditionally credited to Ban Gu, her brother.

Swann worked for many years on her annotated translation of two chapters. the economic treatise, of Han Shu. Sinologist E. Bruce Brooks calls it a "lavishly annotated" translation, and notes "perhaps no deep psychological analysis is necessary to understand why someone who had gone through the Depression with a salary sometimes amounting to zero would be interested in economics." The historian Edward A. Kracke wrote that the work was "not so much an analytical study of the period she treats, the western Han dynasty, as a critical presentation of the principal source materials relating to the subject, in the form of annotated translations with more detailed studies of certain special phases.

== Major publications ==
- ——— (1932). Pan Chao: Foremost Woman Scholar of China. New York: American Historical Association; reprinted: University of Michigan Center for Chinese, 2001; ACLS History E-Book Project, 2008. ISBN 978-0892641505.
- ——— (1934). "A Woman among the Rich Merchants: The Widow of Pa 巴 寡 婦 清 (3rd Century Bc)". Journal of the American Oriental Society. 54 (2): 186–193. doi:10.2307/594635. JSTOR 594635.
- ——— (1936). "Seven Intimate Library Owners". Harvard Journal of Asiatic Studies. 1 (3/4): 363–390. doi:10.2307/2717790. JSTOR 2717790.
- ——— (1950). Food & Money in Ancient China: The Earliest Economic History of China to AD 25, Han Shu 24 with Related Texts, Han Shu 91 and Shih-chi 129. Princeton University Press Princeton.
