= Ban Yong =

2nd century Han dynasty official and general

Ban Yong (Chinese: 班勇; Wade–Giles: Pan Yung, died c. 128 CE), courtesy name Yiliao (宜僚), was the youngest son of the famous Chinese general, Ban Chao, and the nephew of the illustrious historian, Ban Gu, who compiled the Book of Han, the dynastic history of the Former Han dynasty.

== Ban Yong's family ==
- Ban Biao (班彪; 3-54 CE; grandfather)
  - Ban Gu (班固; 32–92; first son)
  - Ban Chao (班超; 32–102; second son)
    - Ban Xiong (班雄; ?-after 107; Ban Chao's eldest son)
      - Ban Shi (班始; ?-130; Ban Xiong's son)
    - Ban Yong (班勇; ?- c. 128; youngest son of Ban Chao)
  - Ban Zhao (班昭; 45–116; daughter)

== Biography ==
In 100 CE, his father, Ban Chao, wrote a request to the Emperor saying, amongst other things: "I have taken care to send my son (Ban) Yong to enter the frontier following porters with presents, and thus, I will arrange things so that (Ban) Yong sees the Middle Territories [meaning China] with his own eyes while I am still alive." See the Book of the Later Han, Chapter 77 (sometimes given as Chapter 47), translated and adapted by E. Édouard Chavannes.

In 107 CE, the Western Regions in modern Xinjiang province rebelled against Chinese rule. Ban Yong was appointed as a Major (Jun Sima 軍司馬) and, with his elder brother, Ban Xiong (班雄), went via Dunhuang to meet up with the Protector General of the Western Regions, Ren Shang (?-119 CE), who had replaced Ban Chao as Protector General in 102 CE. The Chinese had to retreat and, following this, there were no Chinese functionaries in the Western Regions for more than ten years.

In 123 CE the Emperor gave Ban Yong the title of 'Senior Clerk of the Western Regions' so that he could lead five hundred freed convicts west to garrison Liuzhong (= Lukchun, in the southern Turpan Basin). After that, Ban Yong conquered and pacified Turpan and Jimasa (in modern Jimsar County).

In the first month of the following year (3 February-3 March, 124 CE), he arrived in Loulan and rewarded the King of Shanshan with three new ribbons for his submission. Following this, the kings of Aksu and Uch Turpan (the modern town of Wushi), presented themselves with their hands tied behind their backs to make submission. Ban Yong then sent the soldiers of these kingdoms (numbering 10,000 infantry and cavalry) into battle. Close to Turpan he put the 'Yili King' of the Xiongnu to flight in the Yihe Valley. He won over more than 5,000 men of Turpan to his cause, and communications between Turpan and China were reopened. He then established a military colony at Lukchun. In the following year (125 CE) Ban Yong, with more than 6,000 cavalry from the commanderies of Guazhou (modern Dunhuang), Ganzhou (modern Zhangye), and Suzhou (modern Jiuquan), as well as soldiers from Shanshan, Kashgar and Turpan, defeated the King of Jimasa and beheaded both the king and a Xiongnu envoy. He sent their heads to the capital. He also captured more than 8,000 prisoners and 50,000 horses and cattle.

Near the end of the reign of Emperor An [107-125 CE], Ban Yong presented a report to him on the countries to the west of China, covering all the territory to India as well as to the Roman Empire. This report formed the basis, with a few later additions, of the 'Chronicle of the Western Regions' in the Hou Hanshu.

In 126 CE, all the "Six Kingdoms of Jushi" (across the mountains to the north and east of Turpan) submitted to Ban Yong. In 127 CE he subdued Karashahr and then Kucha also capitulated, thus opening the route all the way to Kashgar which, in turn, opened communications once again to the countries further west such as Ferghana, Kangju and the Yuezhi. Only Yuanmeng, Weili [Korla] and Weixu [Hoxud] refused to submit.

In 127 Ban Yong with Zhang Lang, the Governor of Dunhuang, attacked and subdued 17 kingdoms including Karashahr, Kucha, Kashgar, Khotan, and Yarkand, who all came to submit to China. The king of Yuanmeng sent his son then to the palace with offerings. Following this, the Wusun and the countries in the Pamir Mountains stopped disrupting communications to the west. During the attack on Karashahr Zhang Lang was to take the northern passage while Ban Yong was to take the southern passage; since Zhang Lang had accused of committing crimes, Zhang Lang was eager to redeem himself and left earlier than agreed upon with Ban Yong. Zhang Lang would then proceed to subdue the Karashahr with ease, resulting in Ban Yong being seen by the government as being late in making his planned rendez-vous with Zhang Lang. Ban Yong was later recalled to the capital city of Luoyang and was imprisoned. He was later pardoned and died amongst his family.
