= Ban Chao =

Chinese military general, explorer and diplomat (32–102 CE)

- 班超
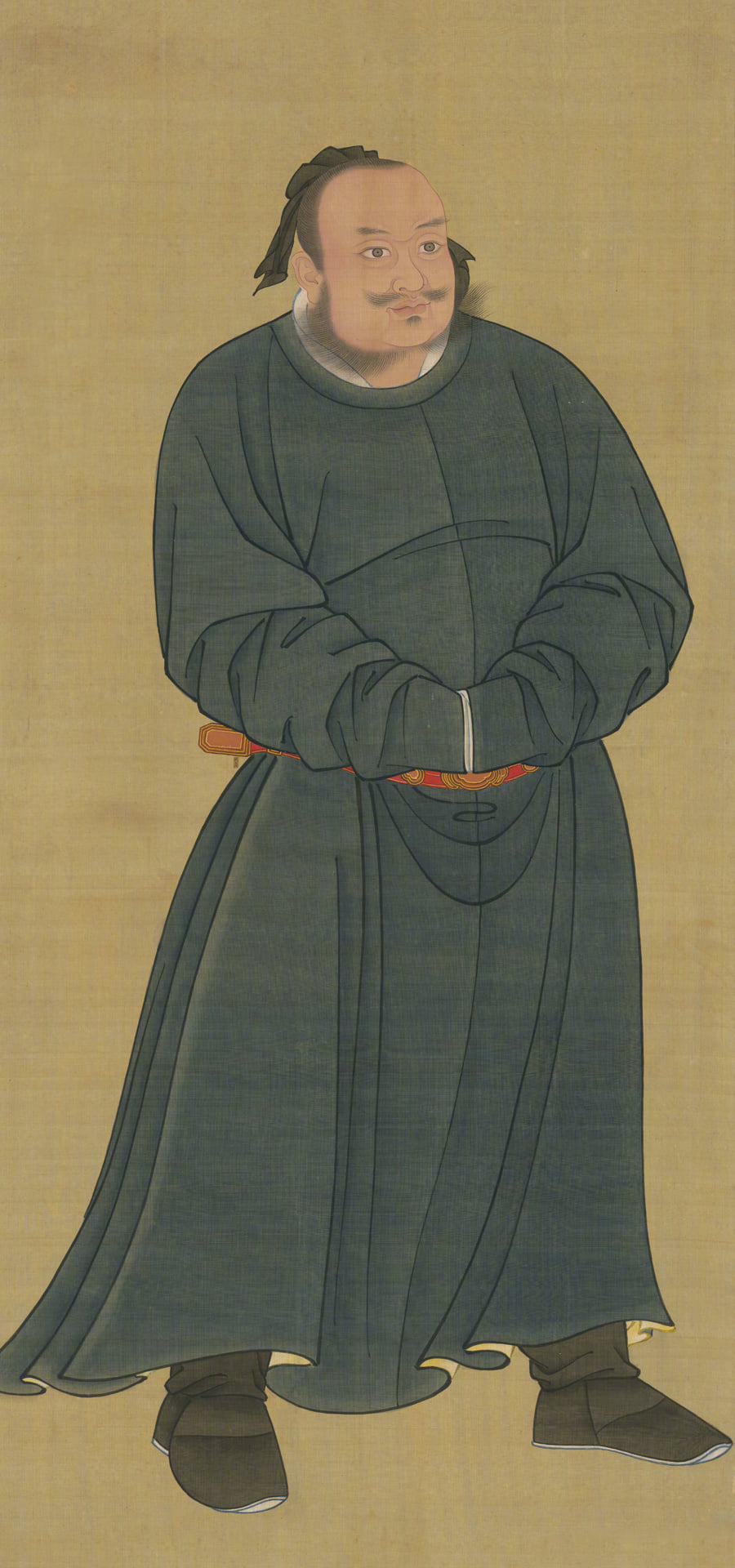
- Ming dynasty portrait of Ban Chao
- Born: 32; Pingling, Fufeng, Eastern Han
- Died: 102 (aged 69–70); Luoyang, Eastern Han
- Military career
- Allegiance: Han dynasty

Chinese name
- Chinese: 班超
Transcriptions
Standard Mandarin
- Hanyu Pinyin: Bān Chāo
- Wade–Giles: Pan Ch'ao

Zhongsheng (courtesy name)
- Chinese: 仲升
Transcriptions
Standard Mandarin
- Hanyu Pinyin: Zhòngshēng
- Wade–Giles: Chung-sheng

Ban Chao (32 – c.October 102 CE), (Note: Ban Chao's biography in Book of the Later Han recorded that he was 71 (by East Asian reckoning) when he died in the 9th month of the 14th year of the Yongyuan era of the reign of Emperor He of Han; he had returned to Luoyang in the 8th month of that year.) courtesy name Zhongsheng, was a Chinese diplomat, explorer, and military general of the Eastern Han dynasty. He was born in Fufeng, now Xianyang, Shaanxi. Three of his family members—father Ban Biao, elder brother Ban Gu, younger sister Ban Zhao—were well known historians who wrote the historical text Book of Han, which recorded the history of the Western Han dynasty. As a Han general and cavalry commander, Ban Chao was in charge of administrating the "Western Regions" (Central Asia) while he was in service. He also led Han forces for over 30 years in the war against the Xiongnu and re-established Han control over the Tarim Basin region. He was made Protector General of the Western Regions by the Han government for his efforts in protecting and governing the regions. Ban Chao is depicted in the Wu Shuang Pu (無雙譜, Table of Peerless Heroes) by Jin Guliang.

As a well-known historian, Ban Chao's family was poor and he worked as a copy-clerk for the government. Emperor Ming himself thought highly of him, and appointed him to be a clerk in the orchid terrace, but Ban Chao was too ambitious to be satisfied with a position like that, and was dismissed later. He was said to be a strong willed young adult with complete disregard for formal conduct. After his brother Ban Gu was removed from his post for his works on the Former Han, Ban Chao argued his case. When his brother was appointed to the imperial library, Ban Chao and his mother moved to the imperial capital Luoyang to accompany him. In 73 however, General Dou Gu embarked on an expedition to attack the Xiongnu, and Ban Chao was appointed as an assistant major. He distinguished himself in command against a Xiongnu detachment, and was appointed by Dou Gu to accompany Officer Guo Xun on a preliminary embassy to the remote western regions. When the group arrived at the capital of Shanshan, King Guang also received an embassy from the Northern Xiongnu. Ban Chao and the small group of delegates slaughtered the Xiongnu envoys and sent their heads to the king. Shocked and overwhelmed, King Guang sent hostages to Han as a pact of non-aggression. This was just the start of the many exploits Ban Chao accomplished in the western regions.

== Control of the Tarim Basin ==
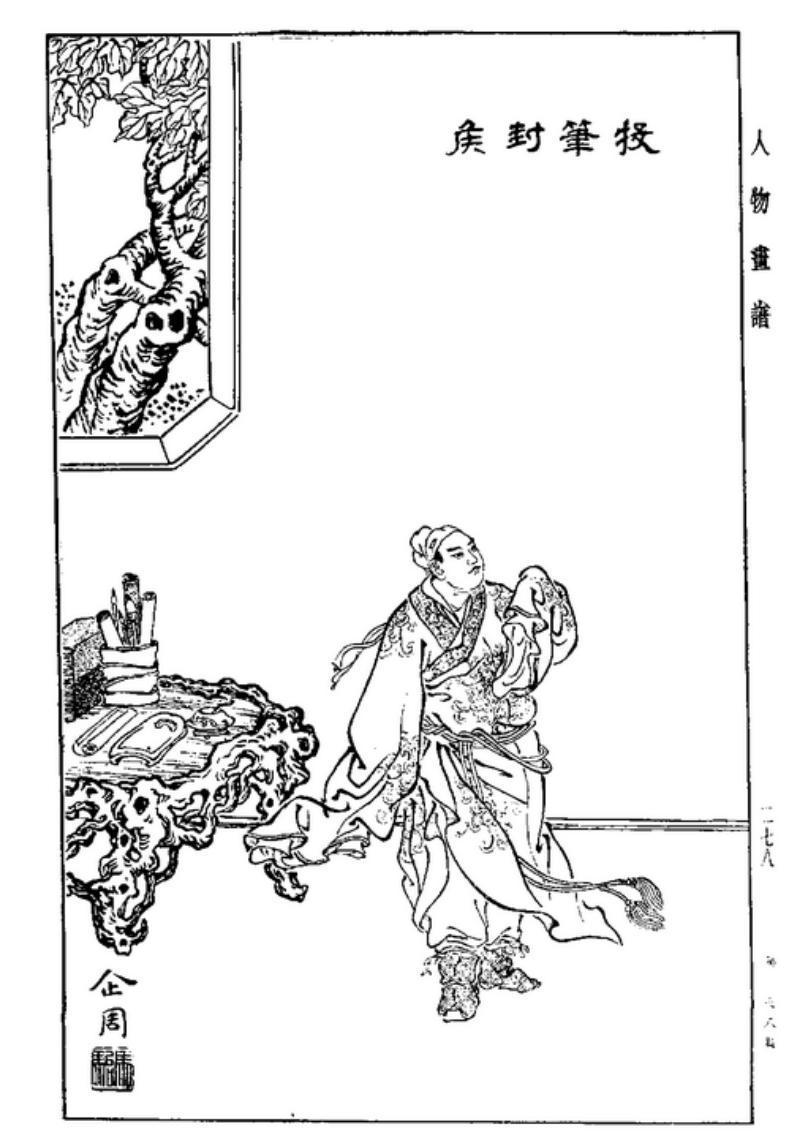
Ban Chao in the Ma Tai Hua Bao

Ban Chao, like his predecessors Huo Qubing and Wei Qing from the Former Han dynasty before him, was effective at expelling the Xiongnu from the Tarim Basin, and brought the various people of the Western Regions under Chinese rule during the second half of the 1st century CE, helping to open and secure the trade routes to the west. He was generally outnumbered, but skillfully played on the divisions among his opponents. The kingdoms of Khotan and Kashgar came under Chinese rule by 74 CE. "Pan Ch'ao crushed fresh rebellions in Kashgar (80, 87) and Yarkand (88), and made the Wusun of the Ili his allies."

Ban Chao was recalled to Luoyang, but then sent again to the Western Region area four years later, during the reign of the new emperor Han Zhang Di. He obtained the military help of the Kushan Empire in 84 in repelling the Kangju who were trying to support the rebellion of the king of Kashgar, and the next year in his attack on Turpan, in the eastern Tarim Basin. Ban Chao ultimately brought the whole of the Tarim Basin under Chinese control.

In recognition for their support to the Chinese, the Kushans (referred to as Da Yuezhi in Chinese sources) requested, but were denied, a Han princess, even though they had sent presents to the Chinese court. In retaliation, they marched on Ban Chao in 90 CE with a force of 70,000 but were defeated by the smaller Chinese force. The Yuezhi retreated and paid tribute to the Chinese Empire. (Later, during the Yuanchu period, 114–120 CE, the Kushans sent a military force to install Chenpan, who had been a hostage among them, as king of Kashgar).

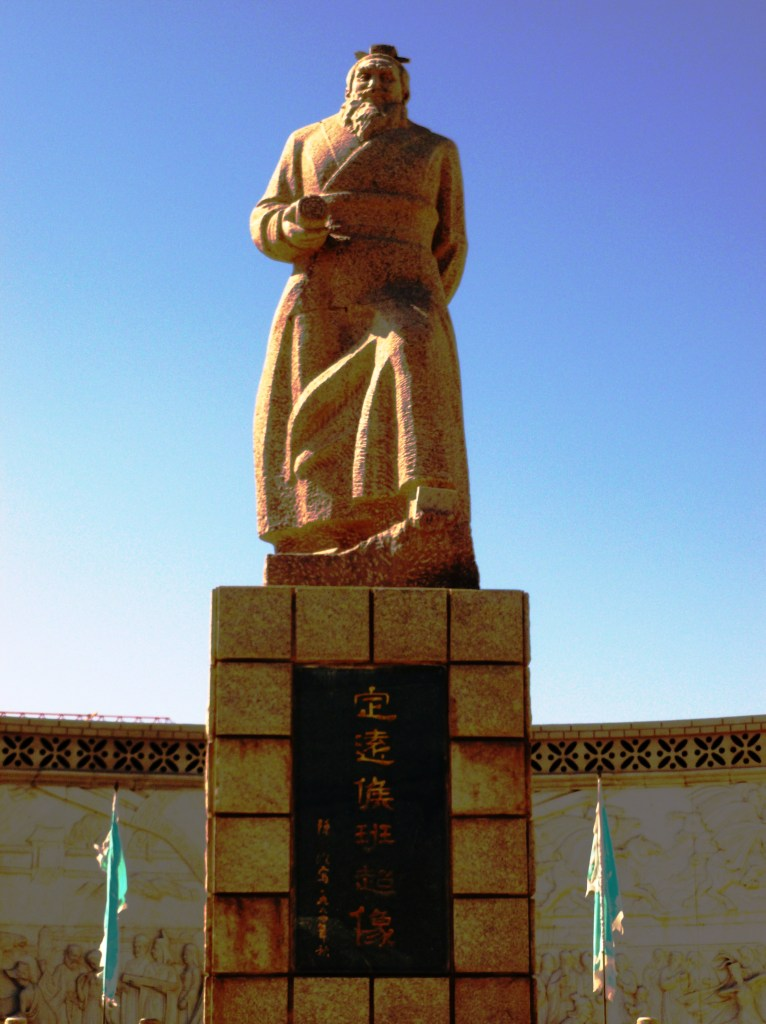
Statue of Ban Chao in Kashgar

In 91 CE, Ban Chao finally succeeded in pacifying the Western Regions and was awarded the title of Protector General and stationed at Qiuci (Kucha). A Wuji Colonel was re-established and, commanding five hundred soldiers, stationed in the Kingdom of Nearer Jushi, within the walls of Gaochang, 29 kilometres southeast of Turfan. In 94 CE, Chao proceeded to again attack and defeat Yanqi [Karashahr]. Subsequently, more than fifty kingdoms presented hostages, as submission to the Han dynasty.

In 97 CE, Ban Chao sent an envoy, Gan Ying, who reached the Persian Gulf or the Black Sea and left the first recorded Chinese account of Europe. Some modern authors have claimed that Ban Chao advanced to the Caspian Sea, however, this interpretation has been criticized as a misreading.

In 102 CE, Ban Chao was retired as Protector General of the Western Regions due to age and ill health, and returned to the capital Luoyang at the age of 70. However, he died there in the following month (9th month of the 14th year of the Yongyuan era; 30 Sept. to 28 Oct. 102). (Note: See: Hou Hanshu, chap 47 (sometimes given as chap. 77). This discrepancy arose as the "records" (志) portion of the work, consisting of 30 volumes, was not originally written by Fan Ye, but were part of the Xu Hanshu compiled by Sima Biao.) (Note: In his Zizhi Tongjian Kaoyi, Sima Guang noted that the Annals of the Later Han by Yuan Hong recorded that Ban died at Luoyang after a few months; Tongjian adopted the account found in Ban's biography in Houhanshu.) Following his death, the power of the Xiongnu in the Western Territories increased again, and subsequent Chinese emperors did not reach so far to the west again until the Tang dynasty.

== A family of historians ==
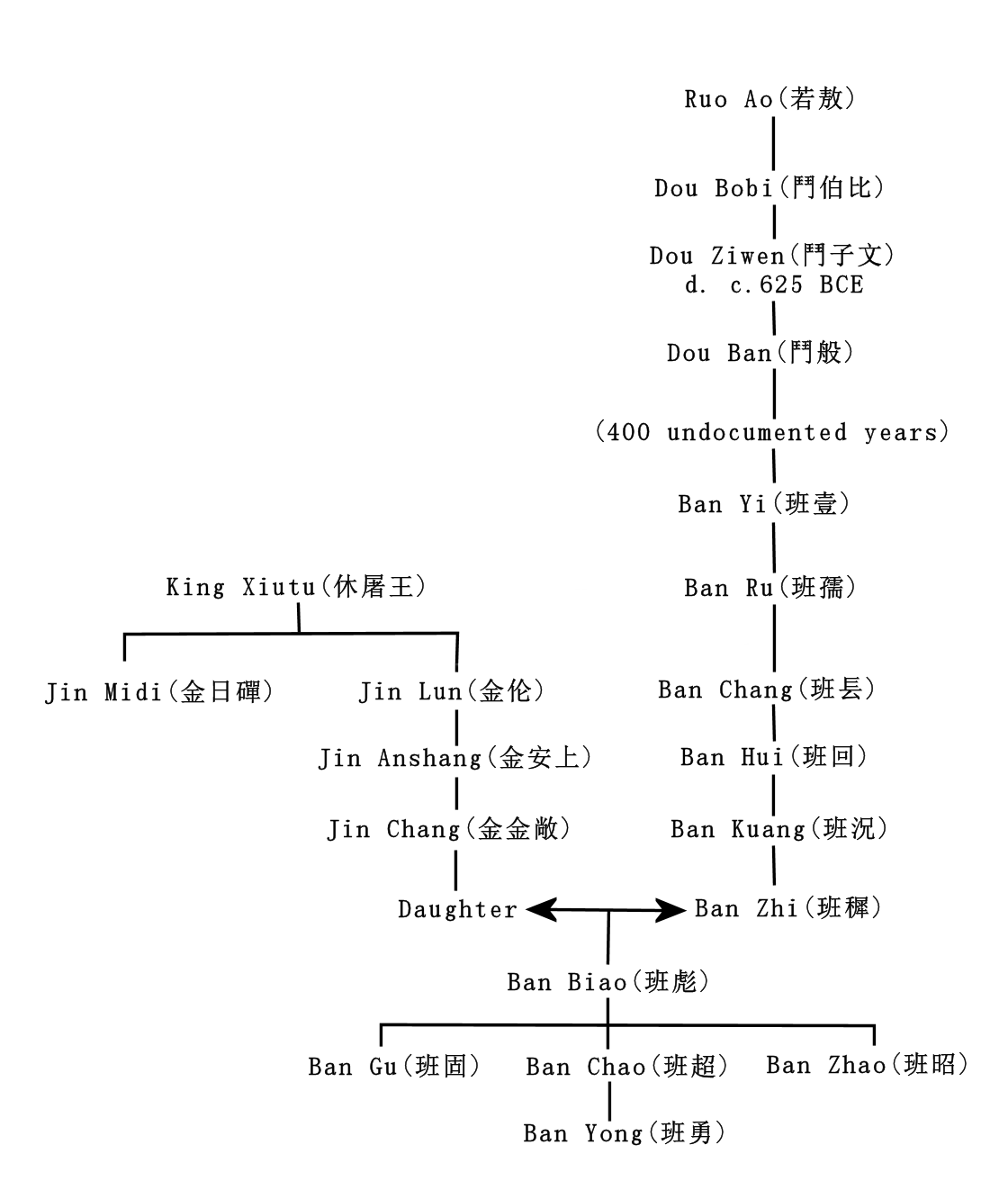
Family tree of Ban Chao.

Ban Chao also belonged to a family of historians. His father was Ban Biao (3–54 CE) who started the History of the Western Han Dynasty (Hanshu; The Book of Han) in 36, which was completed by his son Ban Gu (32–92) and his daughter Ban Zhao (Ban Chao's brother and sister). Ban Chao was probably the key source for the cultural and socio-economic data on the Western Regions contained in the Hanshu. Ban Chao's grandmother on the paternal side was Xiongnu and was a descendant of the Xiongnu king Xiutu. The partly Xiongnu origins of Ban Chao might help explain his skills in matters related to China's history and foreign relations.

Ban Chao's youngest son Ban Yong (班勇 Bān Yŏng) participated in military campaigns with his father and continued to have a central military role in the Tarim Basin into the 120s.

=== Ban Chao's family ===
- Ban Biao (班彪; 3–54; father)
  - Ban Gu (班固; 32–92; first son)
  - Ban Chao (班超; 32–102; second son)
    - Ban Xiong (班雄; ?–after 107; Ban Chao's eldest son)
      - Ban Shi (班始; ?–130; Ban Xiong's son)
    - Ban Yong (班勇; ?–after 127; Ban Chao's youngest son)
  - Ban Zhao (班昭; 45–116; Ban Chao's sister) She's the one who petitioned the reigning Emperor to let his brother return home from his posting.

== Famous quotes ==
Some Chengyu associated with Ban Chao include:

- "Throw away your writing brush and join the military!" (投筆從戎) – based on his words "A brave man has no other plan but to follow Fu Jiezi and Zhang Qian's footsteps and do something and become somebody in a foreign land. How can I waste my life on writing?
- "... he who does not enter the tiger's lair will never catch its cubs." (不入虎穴，不得虎子) – similar to the saying "Nothing ventured, nothing gained."
- "To die without glory is not the act of valiant men." (死無所名，非壯士也)

== See also ==
- Han-Xiongnu War
- Battle of Yiwulu
- Guo Xun
- Zhang Qian
- Ban Yong
