= Ban Biao =

Chinese historian (3–54 CE)

Ban Biao (Chinese: 班彪; pinyin: Bān Biāo; Wade–Giles: Pan^{¹} Piao^{¹}, 8 February 3–29 July 54 CE), courtesy name (Chinese: 叔皮; pinyin: Shūpí; Wade–Giles: Shu^{¹}-P'i^{²}), was a Chinese historian and politician born in what is now Xianyang, Shaanxi during the Han dynasty. He was the son of Han official Ban Zhi, and the nephew of Consort Ban, a famous poet and concubine to Emperor Cheng.

Ban Biao began the Book of Han, which was completed by his son, Ban Gu and daughter Ban Zhao while their brother Ban Chao was a famous general who contributed his stories to expand the Book of Han. Ban Biao wrote an essay titled Treatise on the Mandate of Kings (王命論), which was influential on the Chinese concept of sovereignty and is included in Wenxuan.

It has been argued that Ban Biao's mother was of Xiongnu origin, daughter of Jin Chang (金敞), an attendant to Emperor Yuan of Han (48–33 BCE). Jin Chang was himself a grandson of Jin Lun (金伦), son of Xiongnu King Xiutu and brother of Jin Midi, who had been adopted by Han Wudi and founded of the Jin name (金). This theory posits that Ban Biao's Xiongnu origins might help explain the skills of the Ban family in dealing with matters related to China's history and foreign relations.

== Ban Biao and his descendants ==
- Ban Biao (班彪; 3–54; father)
  - Ban Gu (班固; 32–92; first son)
  - Ban Chao (班超; 32–102; second son)
    - Ban Xiong (班雄; ?–after 107; Ban Chao's eldest son)
      - Ban Shi (班始; ?–130; Ban Xiong's son)
    - Ban Yong (班勇; ?–after 127; Ban Chao's youngest son)
  - Ban Zhao (班昭; 45–116; daughter)

== See also ==
- Book of Han
