= Ban Zhao (crater) =

Crater on Venus

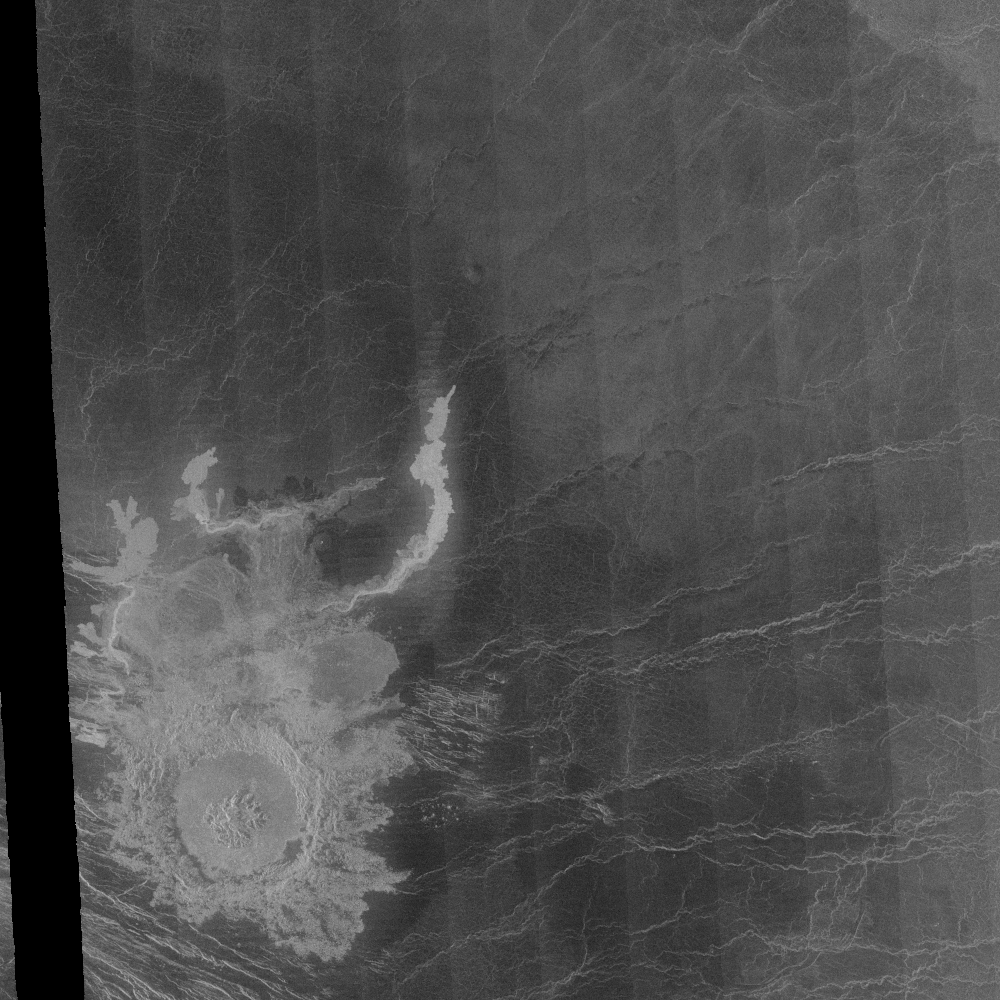
- Magellan radar image of Ban Zhao. Black bands indicates missing data.
- Feature type: Impact crater
- Location: Venus
- Diameter: 38.3 km
- Eponym: Ban Zhao

Ban Zhao is a 38.3 km diameter impact crater located on the surface of Venus. It is located at the quadrangle of Greenaway.

Its name derives and comes from a Chinese historian named Ban Zhao. It was officially adopted and accepted by the International Astronomical Union in 1991.

== Geological features ==
Ban Zhao crater has a diameter of 38.3 km, (Note: The United States Geological Survey lists Ban Zhao with a diameter of 39 km. This is because they often use rounded whole number estimates.) with a continuous ejecta radius of 45.3 km, and a wall width of 6.3 km. Ban Zhao is located in a large crater field and have distinct emissivity feature of a black-and-white type. The crater contains a dark parabola-like feature. The eastern boundary of the high-emissivity parabola crosses several lava flows and lava fields units and no geological boundaries were found at the same positions. The inner part of the higher-emissivity parabola coincides with the radar-dark parabola and therefore is related to the crater ejecta. The exterior of the emissivity parabola is just outside the radar-dark diffuse features seen in the synthetic aperture radar image. Thus the crater-related mantling deposits has a wider extent in the emissivity image in comparison to the dark areas located in the synthetic aperture radar images. The section through the high-emissivity parabola permits the tracing of the relationship between emissivity and the radar cross section. The change in radar brightness along the section is about 10 decibels while at the same time emissivity maintains almost constant values. The parabola of the crater is the darkest in the set and is also not especially smooth at a large scale. The high-emissivity feature is formed by material with a permittivity (ε_{2}) of 3.2. The gradual darkening of radar brightness toward the parabola is caused by the increase of mantle thickness up to about 3 meters if the tangent equals 0.003. There are outflow material extending from Ban Zhao which are approximately 2–3 km wide.
