= Zhang Qian =

Imperial envoy to the world outside of China in the 2nd century BC

Zhang Qian 張騫
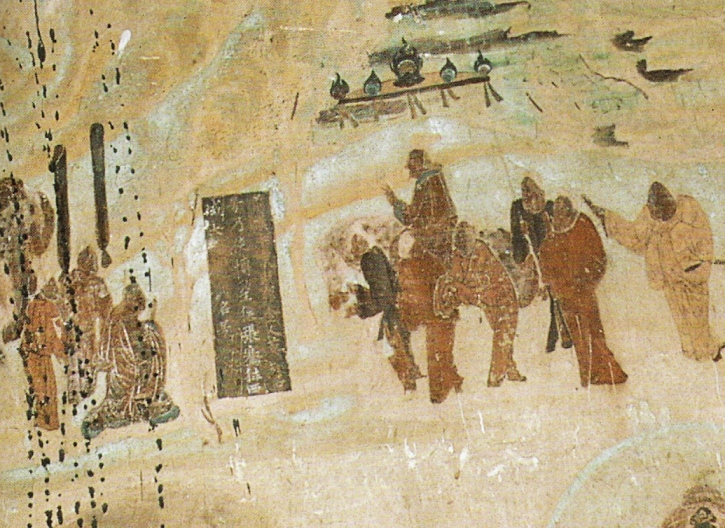
- Zhang Qian taking leave from emperor Han Wudi, for his expedition to Central Asia from 138 to 126 BC, Mogao Caves mural, 618 – 712...
- Born: 195 BC; Hanzhong, Shaanxi, China
- Died: c. 114 BC; China
- Occupation: Explorer

Zhang Qian
- "Zhang Qian" in Traditional (top) and Simplified (bottom) Chinese characters
- Traditional Chinese: 張騫
- Simplified Chinese: 张骞
Transcriptions
Standard Mandarin
- Hanyu Pinyin: Zhāng Qiān
- Gwoyeu Romatzyh: Jang Chian
- Wade–Giles: Chang^{1} Ch'ien^{1}
- IPA: [ʈʂáŋ tɕʰjɛ́n]
Yue: Cantonese
- Yale Romanization: Jēung Hīn
- Jyutping: Zoeng^{1} Hin^{1}
- IPA: [tsœŋ˥ hin˥]
Southern Min
- Hokkien POJ: Tiuⁿ Khian
Middle Chinese
- Middle Chinese: ɖjang kʰjen
Old Chinese
- Baxter–Sagart (2014): *C.traŋ C.qʰra[n]

Zhang Qian (Chinese: 張騫; died c. 114 BC) was a Chinese diplomat, explorer, and politician who served as an imperial envoy to the world outside of China in the late 2nd century BC during the Western Han dynasty. He was one of the first official diplomats to bring back valuable information about Central Asia, including the Greco-Bactrian remains of the Macedonian Empire as well as the Parthian Empire, to the Han dynasty imperial court, then ruled by Emperor Wu of Han.

He played an important pioneering role for the future Chinese conquest of lands west of Xinjiang, including swaths of Central Asia and even lands south of the Hindu Kush (see Protectorate of the Western Regions). This trip created the Silk Road that marked the beginning of globalization between the countries in the east and west. Cultural exchanges along some of these routes had already occurred before Zhang Qian's missions.

Zhang Qian's travel was commissioned by Emperor Wu with the major goal of initiating transcontinental trade in the Silk Road, as well as create political protectorates by securing allies. His missions opened trade routes between East and West and exposed different products and kingdoms to each other through trade. Zhang's accounts were compiled by Sima Qian in the 1st century BC. The Central Asian parts of the Silk Road routes were expanded around 114 BC largely through the missions of and exploration by Zhang Qian. Today, Zhang is considered a Chinese national hero and revered for the key role he played in opening China and the countries of the known world to the wider opportunity of commercial trade and global alliances.

== Zhang Qian's Missions ==
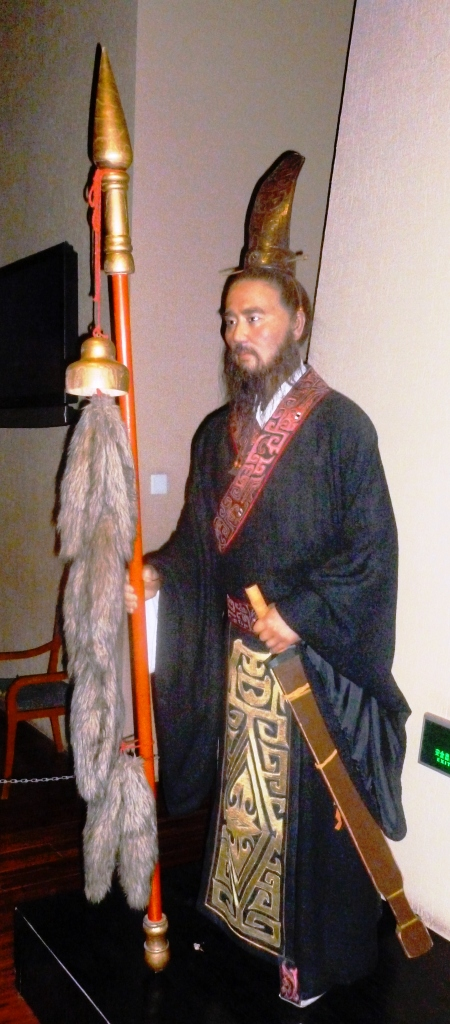
Statue of Zhang Qian in Shaanxi History Museum, Xi'an

Zhang Qian was born in Chenggu district just east of Hanzhong in the north-central province of Shaanxi, China. He entered the capital, Chang'an, (today Xi'an), between 140 BC and 134 BC as a Gentleman (郎), serving Emperor Wu of the Han dynasty. At the time the nomadic Xiongnu tribes controlled what is now Inner Mongolia and dominated the Western Regions, Xiyu (西域), the areas neighbouring the territory of the Han dynasty. The Han emperor was interested in establishing commercial ties with distant lands but outside contact was prevented by the hostile Xiongnu.

The Han court dispatched Zhang Qian, a military officer who was familiar with the Xiongnu, to the Western Regions in 138 BC with a group of ninety-nine members to make contact and build an alliance with the Yuezhi against the Xiongnu. He was accompanied by a guide named Ganfu (甘父), a Xiongnu who had been captured in war. The objective of Zhang Qian's first mission was to seek a military alliance with the Yuezhi, in modern Tajikistan. However to get to the territory of the Yuezhi he was forced to pass through land controlled by the Xiongnu who captured him (as well as Ganfu) and enslaved him for thirteen years. During this time he married a Xiongnu wife, who bore him a son, and gained the trust of the Xiongnu leader.

Zhang and Ganfu (as well as Zhang's Xiongnu wife and son) were eventually able to escape and, passing Lop Nor and following the northern edge of the Tarim Basin, around the Kunlun Mountains and through small fortified areas in the middle of oases in what is now Xinjiang until they made their way to Dayuan and eventually to the land of the Yuezhi. The Yuezhi were agricultural people who produced strong horses and many unknown crops including alfalfa for animal fodder. However, the Yuezhi were too settled to desire war against the Xiongnu. Zhang spent a year in Yuezhi and the adjacent Bactrian territory, documenting their cultures, lifestyles and economy, before beginning his return trip to China, this time following the southern edge of the Tarim Basin. On his return trip he was again captured by the Xiongnu who again spared his life because they valued his sense of duty and composure in the face of death. Two years later the Xiongnu leader died and in the midst of chaos and infighting Zhang Qian escaped. Of the original mission of just over a hundred men, only Zhang Qian and Ganfu managed to return to China.

Zhang Qian returned in 125 BC with detailed news for the Emperor, showing that sophisticated civilizations existed to the West, with which China could advantageously develop relations. The Shiji relates that "the Emperor learned of the Dayuan (大宛), Daxia (大夏), Anxi (安息), and the others, all great states rich in unusual products whose people cultivated the land and made their living in much the same way as the Chinese. All these states, he was told, were militarily weak and prized Han goods and wealth". Upon Zhang Qian's return to China he was honoured with a position of palace counsellor. Although he was unable to develop commercial ties between China and these far-off lands, his efforts did eventually result in trade mission to the Wusun people in 119 BC which led to trade between China and Persia.

On his mission Zhang Qian had noticed products from an area now known as northern India. However, the task remained to find a trade route not obstructed by the Xiongnu to India. Zhang Qian set out on a second mission to forge a route from China to India via Sichuan, but after many attempts this effort proved unsuccessful. In 119–115 BC Zhang Qian was sent on a third mission by the emperor, to develop ties with the Wusun (烏孫) people..

== Zhang Qian's reports ==
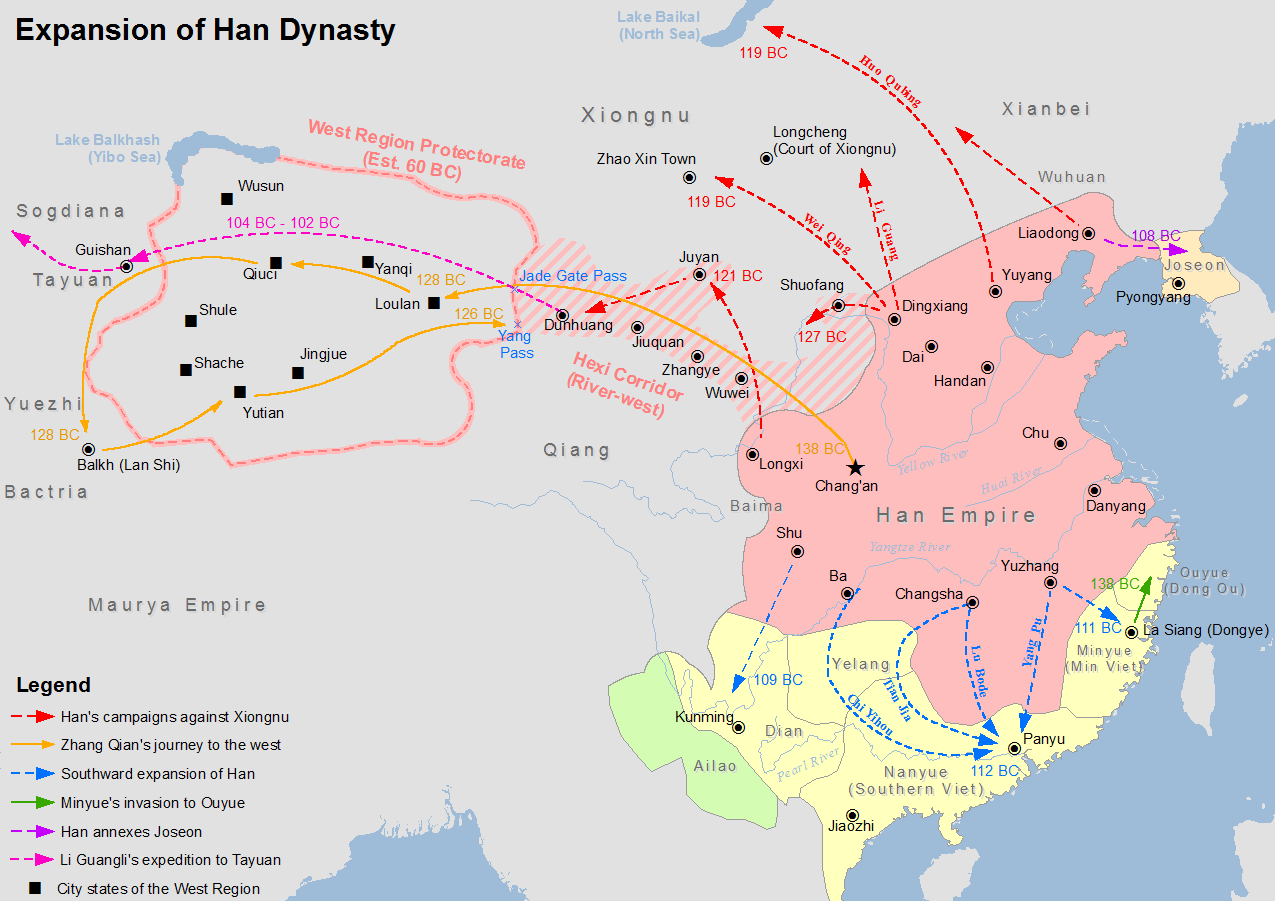
Zhang Qian's travels to the west

The reports of Zhang Qian's travels are quoted extensively in the 1st century BC Chinese historic chronicles "Records of the Great Historian" (Shiji) by Sima Qian. Zhang Qian visited directly the kingdom of Dayuan (大宛) in Fergana, the territories of the Yuezhi (月氏) in Transoxiana, the Bactrian country of Daxia (大夏) with its remnants of Greco-Bactrian rule, and Kangju (康居). He also made reports on neighbouring countries that he did not visit, such as Anxi (安息) (Arsacid territories), Tiaozhi (條支/条支) (Seleucid Empire in Mesopotamia), Shendu (身毒) (India) and the Wusun (烏孫).

=== Dayuan (大宛, Ferghana) ===
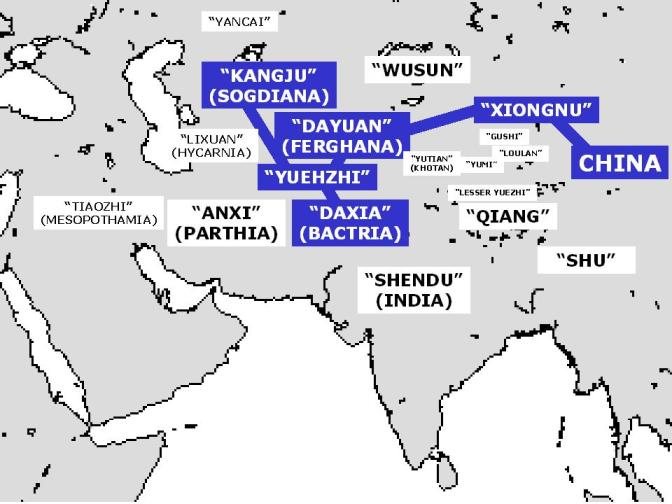
Countries described in Zhang Qian's report. Visited countries are highlighted in blue.

After being released from captivity by Xiongnu, Zhang Qian visited Dayuan, located in the Fergana region west of the Tarim Basin. The people of Dayuan were being portrayed as sophisticated urban dwellers similar to the Parthians and the Bactrians. The name Dayuan is thought to be a transliteration of the word Yona, the Greek descendants that occupied the region from the 4th to the 2nd century BCE. It was during this stay that Zhang reported the famous tall and powerful "blood-sweating" Ferghana horse. The refusal by Dayuan to offer these horses to Emperor Wu of Han resulted in two punitive campaigns launched by the Han dynasty to acquire these horses by force.

"Dayuan lies south-west of the territory of the Xiongnu, some 10,000 li directly west of China. The people are settled on the land, ploughing the fields and growing rice and wheat. They also make wine out of grapes. The people live in houses in fortified cities, there being some seventy or more cities of various sizes in the region. The population numbers several hundred thousand" (Shiji, 123, Zhang Qian quote, trans. Burton Watson).

Later the Han dynasty conquered the region in the War of the Heavenly Horses.

=== Yuezhi (月氏) ===
After obtaining the help of the king of Dayuan, Zhang Qian went south-west to the territory of the Yuezhi, with whom he was supposed to obtain a military alliance against the Xiongnu.

"The Great Yuezhi live some 2,000 or 3,000 li west of Dayuan, north of the Gui (Oxus) river. They are bordered to the south by Daxia (Bactria), on the west by Anxi, and on the north by Kangju (康居). They are a nation of nomads, moving place to place with their herds and their customs are like those of the Xiongnu. They have some 100,000 or 200,000 archer warriors." (adapted from Shiji, 123, Zhang Qian quote, trans. Burton Watson).

Zhang Qian also describes the origins of the Yuezhi, explaining they came from the eastern part of the Tarim Basin. This has encouraged some historians to connect them to the Caucasoid mummies of the Tarim. (The question of links between the Yuezhi and the Tocharians of the Tarim is still debatable.)

"The Yuezhi originally lived in the area between the Qilian or Heavenly Mountains (Tian Shan) and Dunhuang, but after they were defeated by the Xiongnu they moved far away to the west, beyond Dayuan (Ferghana), where they attacked the people of Daxia (Bactria) and set up the court of their king on the northern bank of the Gui (Oxus) river." (Shiji, 123, Zhang Qian quote, trans. Burton Watson).

A smaller group of Yuezhi, the "Little Yuezhi", were not able to follow the exodus and reportedly found refuge among the "Qiang barbarians".

Zhang was the first Chinese to write about one humped dromedary camels which he saw in this region.

=== Daxia (大夏, Bactria) ===
Zhang Qian probably witnessed the last period of the Greco-Bactrian Kingdom, as it was being subjugated by the nomadic Yuezhi. Only small powerless chiefs remained, who were apparently vassals to the Yuezhi horde. Their civilization was urban, almost identical to the civilizations of Anxi and Dayuan, and the population was numerous.

"Daxia is situated over 2,000 li south-west of Dayuan (Ferghana), south of the Gui (Oxus) river. Its people cultivate the land, and have cities and houses. Their customs are like those of Dayuan. It has no great ruler but only a number of petty chiefs ruling the various cities. The people are poor in the use of arms and afraid of battle, but they are clever at commerce. After the Great Yuezhi moved west and attacked and conquered Daxia, the entire country came under their sway. The population of the country is large, numbering some 1,000,000 or more persons. The capital is Lanshi (Bactra) where all sorts of goods are bought and sold." (Shiji, 123, Zhang Qian quote, translation Burton Watson).

Cloth from Shu (Sichuan) was found there.

=== Shendu (身毒, India) ===
Zhang Qian also reports about the existence of India south-east of Bactria. The name Shendu (身毒) comes from the Sanskrit word "Sindhu", meaning the Indus river. Sindh was at the time ruled by Indo-Greek Kingdoms, which explains the reported cultural similarity between Bactria and India:

"Southeast of Daxia is the kingdom of Shendu (India)... Shendu, they told me, lies several thousand li south-east of Daxia (Bactria). The people cultivate the land and live much like the people of Daxia. The region is said to be hot and damp. The inhabitants ride elephants when they go in battle. The kingdom is situated on a great river (Indus)" (Shiji, 123, Zhang Qian quote, trans. Burton Watson).

=== Anxi (安息, Parthia) ===
Zhang Qian identifies "Anxi" (Chinese: 安息) as an advanced urban civilization, like Dayuan (Ferghana) and Daxia (Bactria). The name "Anxi" is a transcription of "Arshak" (Arsaces), the name of the founder of Arsacid Empire that ruled the regions along the Silk Road between the Tedzhen river in the east and the Tigris in the west, and running through Aria, Parthia proper, and Media proper.

"Anxi is situated several thousand li west of the region of the Great Yuezhi. The people are settled on the land, cultivating the fields and growing rice and wheat. They also make wine out of grapes. They have walled cities like the people of Dayuan (Ferghana), the region contains several hundred cities of various sizes. The coins of the country are made of silver and bear the face of the king. When the king dies, the currency is immediately changed and new coins issued with the face of his successor. The people keep records by writing on horizontal strips of leather. To the west lies Tiaozhi (Mesopotamia) and to the north Yancai and Lixuan (Hyrcania)." (Shiji, 123, Zhang Qian quote, trans. Burton Watson).

=== Tiaozhi (条支, Seleucid Empire in Mesopotamia) ===
Zhang Qian's reports on Mesopotamia and the Seleucid Empire, or Tiaozhi (条支), are in tenuous terms. He did not himself visit the region, and was only able to report what others told him.

"Tiaozhi (Mesopotamia) is situated several thousand li west of Anxi (Arsacid territory) and borders the "Western Sea" (which could refer to the Persian Gulf or Mediterranean). It is hot and damp, and the people live by cultivating the fields and planting rice... The people are very numerous and are ruled by many petty chiefs. The ruler of Anxi (the Arsacids) give orders to these chiefs and regards them as vassals." (adapted from Shiji, 123, Zhang Qian quote, trans. Burton Watson).

=== Kangju (康居) northwest of Sogdiana (粟特) ===
The Kanju received the visit of Zhang Qian circa 128 BCE.

Zhang Qian also visited directly the area of Sogdiana (Kangju), home to the Sogdian nomads:

"Kangju is situated some 2,000 li north-west of Dayuan (Bactria). Its people are nomads and resemble the Yuezhi in their customs. They have 80,000 or 90,000 skilled archer fighters. The country is small, and borders Dayuan. It acknowledges sovereignty to the Yuezhi people in the South and the Xiongnu in the East." (Shiji, 123, Zhang Qian quote, trans. Burton Watson).

=== Yancai (奄蔡, Vast Steppe) ===
"Yancai lies some 2,000 li north-west of Kangju (centered on Turkestan at Beitian). The people are nomads and their customs are generally similar to those of the people of Kangju. The country has over 100,000 archer warriors, and borders a great shore-less lake, perhaps what is now known as the Northern Sea (Aral Sea, distance between Tashkent to Aralsk is about 866 km)" (Shiji, 123, Zhang Qian quote, trans. Burton Watson).

== Development of East-West contacts ==
Following Zhang Qian's embassy and report, commercial relations between China and Central as well as Western Asia flourished, as many Chinese missions were sent throughout the end of the 2nd century BC and the 1st century BC, initiating the development of the Silk Road:

"The largest of these embassies to foreign states numbered several hundred persons, while even the smaller parties included over 100 members... In the course of one year anywhere from five to six to over ten parties would be sent out." (Shiji, trans. Burton Watson).

Many objects were soon exchanged, and travelled as far as Guangzhou in the East, as suggested by the discovery of a Persian box and various artefacts from Central Asia in the 122 BC tomb of King Zhao Mo of Nanyue.

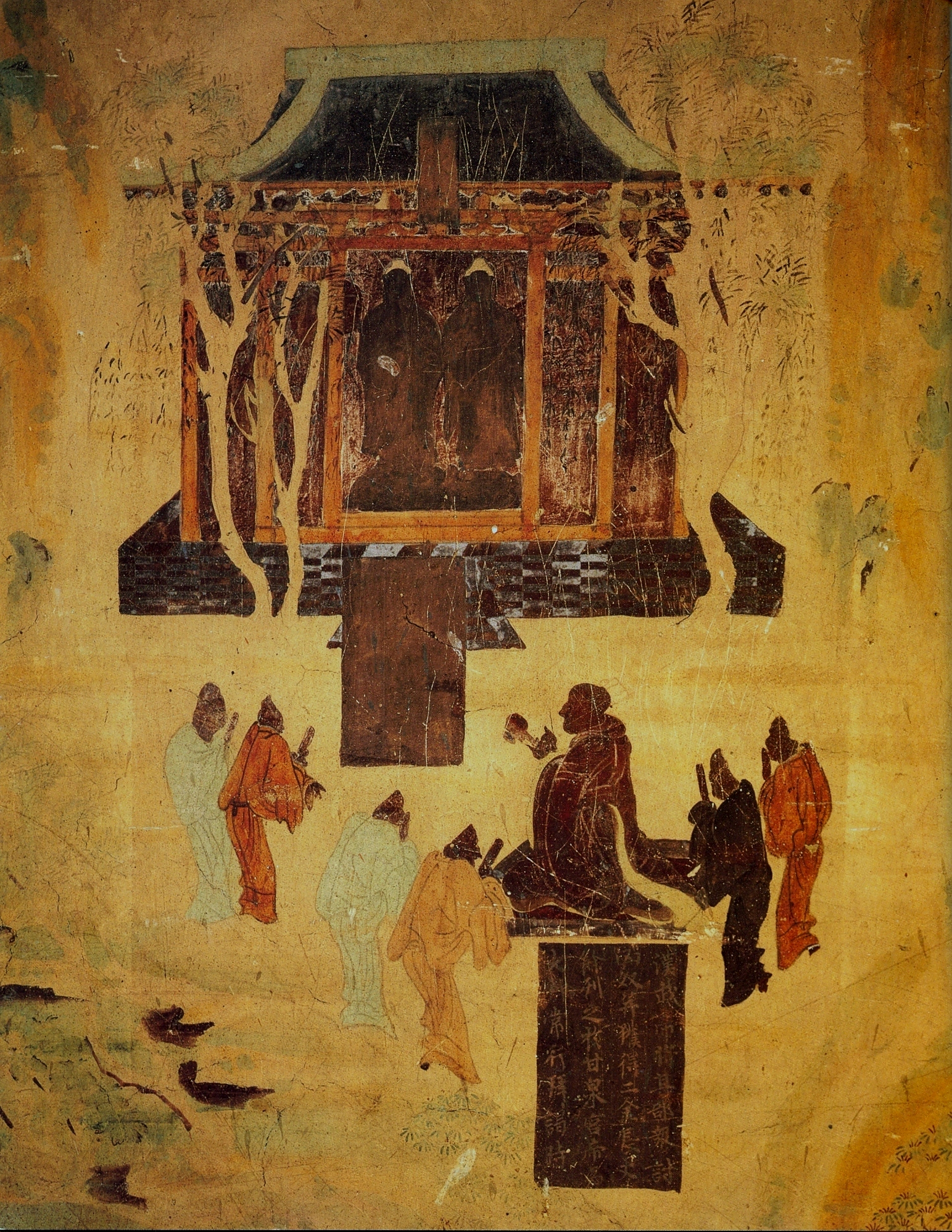
Mogao Caves 8th-century mural depicting the pseudohistorical legend of Emperor Wu of Han worshipping "golden man" Buddha statues captured in 121 BC.

Murals in Mogao Caves in Dunhuang describe the Emperor Han Wudi (156–87 BC) worshipping Buddhist statues, explaining them as "golden men brought in 120 BC by a great Han general in his campaigns against the nomads", although there is no other mention of Han Wudi worshipping the Buddha in Chinese historical literature.

China also sent a mission to Anxi, which were followed up by reciprocal missions from Parthian envoys around 100 BC:

"When the Han envoy first visited the kingdom of Anxi, the king of Anxi (the Arsacid ruler) dispatched a party of 20,000 horsemen to meet them on the eastern border of the kingdom... When the Han envoys set out again to return to China, the king of Anxi dispatched envoys of his own to accompany them... The emperor was delighted at this." (adapted from Shiji, 123, trans. Burton Watson).

The Roman historian Florus describes the visit of numerous envoys, including Seres (Chinese or central Asians), to the first Roman Emperor Augustus, who reigned between 27 BC and 14:

"Even the rest of the nations of the world which were not subject to the imperial sway were sensible of its grandeur, and looked with reverence to the Roman people, the great conqueror of nations. Thus even Scythians and Sarmatians sent envoys to seek the friendship of Rome. Nay, the Seres came likewise, and the Indians who dwelt beneath the vertical sun, bringing presents of precious stones and pearls and elephants, but thinking all of less moment than the vastness of the journey which they had undertaken, and which they said had occupied four years. In truth it needed but to look at their complexion to see that they were people of another world than ours." ("Cathay and the way thither", Henry Yule).

In 97, the Chinese general Ban Chao dispatched an envoy to Rome in the person of Gan Ying.

Several Roman embassies to China followed from 166, and are officially recorded in Chinese historical chronicles.

== Military campaign against the Xiongnu ==
In 121 BC, Zhang Qian, who was already familiar with Xiongnu territory, transitioned into a military role and participated in a campaign against the Xiongnu alongside the legendary "flying" general Li Guang. This campaign was ordered by Emperor Wu of the Han dynasty to drive the Xiongnu out of the strategic Hexi Corridor (河西走廊). They were tasked to form a diversionary force to the east, their mission was to strike the Xiongnu’s eastern flank to draw enemy attention, resources, and reinforcements away from Huo Qubing's main advance in the west.

During this offensive, Li Guang led a force of 4,000 cavalry out of Youbeiping Commandery (右北平郡) while Zhang Qian commanded a separate, logistical and reinforcing column meant to link up with him in battle. However, the campaign turned into a disaster. Zhang Qian, who was serving as a commander bearing the title of Marquis of Bowang (博望侯), got lost and failed to arrive at the rendezvous point on time. Consequently, Li Guang’s vanguard was completely surrounded, heavily outnumbered 1 to 10 and defeated by the Xiongnu forces, facing near-annihilation.

Following the tactical failure, the Han military court sentenced Zhang Qian to death. He narrowly avoided execution by paying a hefty ransom, which stripped him of his titles and reduced him to commoner status.

== Final years and legacy ==
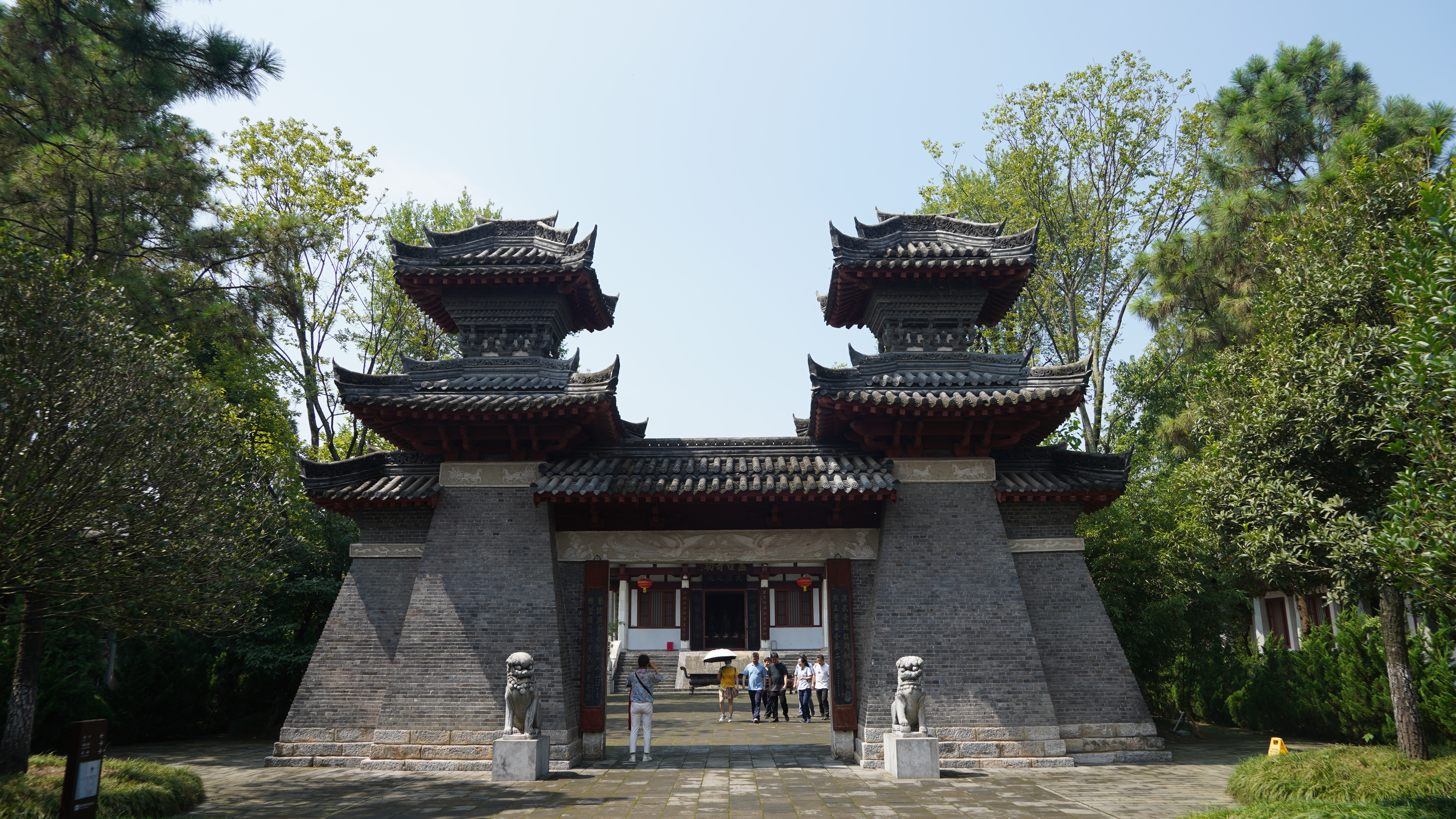
Entrance to the tomb in Chenggu County, Shaanxi

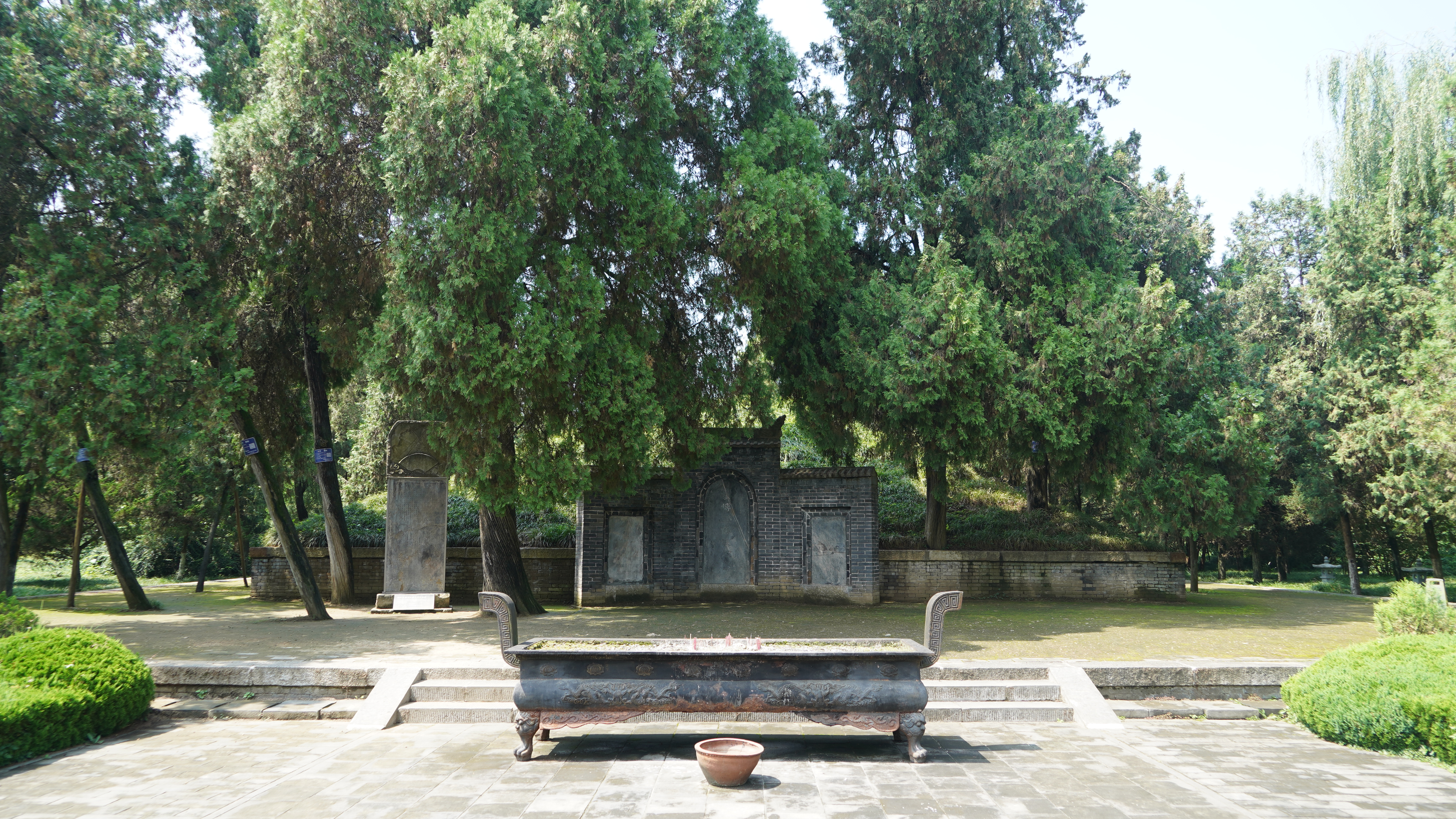
Tumulus of Zhang Qian

The Shiji reports that Zhang Qian returned from his final expedition to the Wusun in 115 BC. After his return he "was honoured with the post of grand messenger, making him among the nine highest ministers of the government. A year or so later he died."

"The indications regarding the year of his passing differ, but Shih Chih-mien (1961), p. 268 shows beyond doubt that he died in 113 B.C. His tomb is situated in Chang-chia ts'un 張家村 near Ch'eng-ku . . . ; during repairs carried out in 1945 a clay mold with the inscription 博望家造 [Home of the Bowang (Marquis)] was found, as reported by Ch'en Chih (1959), p. 162." Hulsewé and Loewe (1979), p. 218, note 819.

== Other achievements ==
From his missions he brought back many important products, the most important being alfalfa seeds (for growing horse fodder), strong horses with hard hooves, and knowledge of the extensive existence of new products, peoples and technologies of the outside world. He died c. 114 BC after spending twenty-five years travelling on these dangerous and strategic missions. Although at a time in his life he was regarded with disgrace for being defeated by the Xiongnu, by the time of his passing he had been bestowed with great honours by the emperor.

Zhang Qian's journeys had promoted a great variety of economic and cultural exchanges between the Han dynasty and the Western Regions. Because silk became the dominant product traded from China, this great trade route later became known as the Silk Road.

== See also ==
- Seres
- Ban Chao
- Faxian
- Xuanzang
- Chen Cheng
- Zheng He
- Yi Jing
- Rabban Bar Sauma
- Tianzhu (India)
