= East Asian Library and the Gest Collection =

Library at Princeton University, New Jersey, US

Coordinates: 40.350335°N 74.657036°W

The East Asian Library and the Gest Collection (pronounced "Guest") in the Princeton University Library is the university's principal collection of materials in Chinese, Japanese, and Korean languages, as well as works on Chinese, Japanese and Korean linguistics and literatures in Western languages.

The Gest Oriental Library is named in honor of Guion Moore Gest (1864–1948), whose collection of Chinese books and manuscripts formed the Gest Chinese Research Library. The Gest Research Library was officially opened on February 13 (Chinese New Year's Day), 1926, at McGill University in Montreal. It was renamed the Gest Oriental Library when the collection was moved to Princeton in 1937. The library's holdings were expanded into Japanese and Korean after World War II to form one of the largest collections in North America. The Chinese collection is especially strong in Ming dynasty editions and works on traditional Chinese medicine.

== History of the Gest Collection ==
=== The original collection ===
Guion Moore Gest built one of the largest collections of Chinese language rare books in North America in spite of the fact that he was not especially wealthy and could not read Chinese. Hu Shih, a prominent scholar who served as curator 1950–1952, noted that the collection, which "began as a hobby and developed into an investment, soon became a burden to a founder".

Gest travelled often to Asia in the 1910s and 1920s on business for the Gest Engineering Company, which he founded and headed. As early as the 1890s he developed an interest in Buddhism and bought a Japanese manuscript scroll. He retained Chen Baozhen, a Chinese scholar who had been an imperial tutor, to locate and purchase books for his collection. Chen assembled more than 8,000 volumes, (juan?) mostly standard works.

After Chen's death in 1900, Gest retained an agent in Beijing, Commander I.V. Gillis (1875–1948), a retired United States Naval Attaché. He spoke Mandarin Chinese fluently, but could not read classical Chinese texts that had not been punctuated. He developed intimate knowledge through many years of handling books, however, and a leading Chinese bibliographer who examined his collection and his catalogues wrote that "his knowledge of Chinese bibliography is exceptionally good". Gillis' wife was a Manchu princess, and his web of personal relations led him to the Guangxu emperor's tutor and other high officials with collections of useful volumes. Gest suffered from glaucoma, and Gillis suggested that he try an eye medicine which was a specialty the Ma family of Dingxian, Hebei province, who kept a shop in the capital. This medicine sparked Gest's interest in traditional Chinese medicine and in collecting books on the subject.

Because Gest's funds were limited, Gillis bought selectively, concentrating on works printed in the Ming and Qing dynasties, which were of less interest to wealthy Chinese and Japanese collectors than works printed in the Song dynasty. He acquired "Palace editions," treatises printed by government agencies, commercial publishers, and manuscripts from all parts of the country. He did not always insist on rare editions, though he bought a great many. Gest and Gillis acquired some 500 works in 2,000 juan on Chinese medicine, the largest such collection in the West at the time. Probably the most important single work in the history of Chinese medicine, Li Shizhen's Bencao gangmu (The Compendium of Materia Medica), for instance, was published in the 16th century, but the collection's edition is a 19th-century reprint. Together with later additions, the collection offers material all aspects of medical thought and practice, as well as the history of Chinese science.

Gillis' staff of three searched bookstores and examined private collections. Gillis had worked in American naval intelligence, and enjoyed using his training to demonstrate to his friends how to determine that the same person had used different typewriters by the similar weight of their strokes. He once verified the date of a purported Sung dynasty book by examining the paper fiber under a microscope. He and his staff marked missing or damaged pages with signed slips and had damaged books interleaved, rebound, and boxed. Gillis catalogued the books, which meant that they were ready to shelve upon arrival in North America, and he even crated and shipped the furniture and wall decorations that were used first at McGill and then at Princeton.

In 1928 Gest hired the third person responsible for the early buildup of the collection, Nancy Lee Swann, a returned missionary who was then finishing her doctoral degree in Chinese studies at Columbia University. She moved to Montreal and supplied a professional competence needed to turn a collection of rarities into a working collection. The catalogue of the collection had been prepared by the first curator, whose Chinese was not adequate. Gillis called it "truly pathetic." Swann revised the catalogue and became curator in 1933. She remained curator until her retirement in 1946. Gest, Gillis, and Dr. Swann built the collection from some 232 titles in 8,000 fascicles in 1928 to close to 130,000 by the time the collection was moved to Princeton.

By 1932, Gest's Chinese collection at McGill was second in size only to that of the Library of Congress. Gest explained his motivations in building his collection and establishing the library at McGill:

There has been no attempt at any time to buy in volume for quantity's sake alone, but the one object has been to obtain the best of the old works that could be secured and perpetuate them in a home where a full realization could be made by the Western World of the culture of China. ("A Statement from the Founder")

Gest and Swann energetically promoted use of the collection. In 1933, Gest promoted a project for doctors at the Rockefeller Institute for Medical Research to research the use of acupuncture to stimulate the sympathetic nervous system. Swann welcomed prominent sinologists and authors such as Berthold Laufer and L. Carrington Goodrich, and Pearl S. Buck, as well as applying for research funds with the American Council of Learned Societies. The Gest collection fell behind in its rivalry with the Library of Congress because McGill could not offer support.

The economic crisis of the 1930s put the collection and the library at risk. After 1934, McGill could no longer pay Swann's salary or provide quarters for the collection and closed the Chinese studies program that had been started only a few years earlier. Gest at first paid Swann's salary of $2,000 when he could, but his eyesight and business were both failing. For several years Swann worked without pay and Gillis used $10,000 of his own savings to purchase and ship acquisitions.

=== The move to Princeton ===
Gest explored selling the collection to Harvard or Yale universities, but finally turned to the Rockefeller Institute for Medical Research for help in purchasing the collection back from McGill, and then donating it to the Princeton Institute for Advanced Study The institute, however, had no expertise in the area and the university had no program in Chinese studies. In contrast to the spacious and comfortable rooms in Toronto, the collection was now housed in what Swann called "makeshift quarters" in the basement of 20 Nassau Street, a storefront building owned by the university. Dr. Swann, the only full-time staff member, had responsibility for all aspects of the library, from cataloging to checking out books to guiding visiting scholars through the collection. During a heavy storm, she had to rouse the janitorial staff to place barriers on the floor above to keep water from coming through.

Guion Moore Gest died in 1948, as did his longtime agent Gillis. Swann received a paycheck marked "FINAL". She protested that she was entitled to three months' notice, but the trustees of the Institute for Advanced Study extended her retirement by only two months. When Princeton's Firestone Library was completed in 1948, the Institute transferred the Gest Collection there.

=== Postwar growth ===
During World War II and the early post-war years, the university established programs in Chinese and Japanese studies, which required increased library holdings. From 1950 to 1952, the curator was Hu Shih, distinguished Chinese scholar and former ambassador from China to the United States. Hu engaged James Tung (Dong Shigang) as his assistant, who became Curator and served from 1952 to 1977.

The collection expanded substantially under Tung's curatorship. Princeton faculty member Frederick W. Mote guided further development on the Chinese side, and Marius Jansen led a major expansion of Japanese holdings. The collection of Japanese historical documents and publications became particularly rich.The collection was renamed the Princeton East Asian Library, though often called the Gest Library. In 1972 the collection was transferred to Palmer and Jones Halls.

The collection at the time of the move to Princeton in 1937 held some 100,000 volumes (juan), 40% of which were manuscripts, early printings, and rare editions. The 24,000 volumes of works printed in the Ming dynasty made it one of the largest in the West. After World War II, the collection became the third largest in the US, after the Harvard-Yenching collection (which it had once outranked), and the Library of Congress holdings, which are almost twice as large. In 2016, the library held roughly 425,000 volumes of Chinese books, with a special strength in pre-modern literature and history; some 163,000 volumes of Japanese language book; a smaller collection of Korean language books; and more than 20,000 western language volumes. Acquisition librarians specialize in each of the major areas.

Professor Ch'u Wan-li (Qu Wanli; 1907–1979), Curator of the National Central Library and the Institute of History and Philology, Academic Sinica, in Taiwan compiled a 671-page Catalogue of the Chinese Rare Books in the Gest Collection of the Princeton University, published in Taiwan in 1974.

== Publications ==
The library publishes The Gest Library Journal (ISSN: 0891-0553), which started in 1986 and was renamed The East Asian Library Journal (ISSN: 1079-8021) in 1994. The contents are available free online.

== References and further reading ==
- Axtell, James (2006), The Making of Princeton University: From Woodrow Wilson to the Present, Princeton, New Jersey: Princeton University Press, ISBN 0691126860
- Brooks, E Bruce (2008), "Nancy Lee Swann (1881 - 1966)", Sinological Profiles, University of Massachusetts, Amherst, archived from the original on 2017-04-01
- Cheng, Charmian (1984), "The Rare Book Collection on Chinese Medicine in the Gest Oriental Library at Princeton University", Journal of East Asian Libraries, 75 (4): 11–15
- Ch'ü, Wan-li (Qu Wanli) (1974). A Catalogue of the Chinese Rare Books in the Gest Collection of the Princeton University Library 普林斯頓大學葛思德東方圖書舘中文善本書志 (Pulinsidun Daxue Geside Dongfang Tushuguan Zhongwen Shanben Shuzhi. Taipei: Yee Wen. OCLC 14945637.
- Heijdra, Martin J. (2010), "The East Asia Library and the Gest Collection at Princeton University", in Zhou, Peter X. (ed.), Collecting Asia: East Asian Libraries in North America, 1868-2008, Ann Arbor: Association for Asian Studies, ISBN 9780924304569
- Hu, Shih (Spring 1954), "The Gest Oriental Library at Princeton University", The Princeton University Library Chronicle, 15 (3): 113–141, doi:10.2307/26406952, JSTOR 26406952 reprinted in: Chou, Chih-p'ing, ed. (2013). "The Gest Oriental Library at Princeton University". English Writings of Hu Shih. China Academic Library. Springer Berlin Heidelberg. pp. 177–196. doi:10.1007/978-3-642-31184-0_26. ISBN 978-3-642-31183-3.
- —— (2013), "The Gest Oriental Library at Princeton University", English Writings of Hu Shih Volume 1, Springer, ISBN 9783642311840
- History of the East Asian Library and the Gest Collection, Princeton University, East Asian Library and Gest Collection, archived from the original on 2015-04-22
- Perushek, Diane E. (1985). "Nancy Lee Swann and the Gest Chinese Research Library". Journal of East Asian Libraries. 1985 (77): 5.
- Swanson, Bruce; McDowell, Don; Tomasko, Nancy; Morrison, Vince (2013), A Plain Sailorman in China: The Life of and Times of Cdr. I.V. Gillis, USN, 1875-1948, Naval Review Press, ISBN 9781612513928
- Tsien, Tsuen-Hsuin (September 1979), "Trends in Collection Building for East Asian Studies in American Libraries" (PDF), College and Research Libraries, 40 (5): 405–415, doi:10.5860/crl_40_05_405
- Yates, Charles L. (1987), "The Gest Library and the Study of Early Modern Japan: A Room with a View" (PDF), The Gest Library Journal, 2 (1): 8–15
