= Ban Gu =

Chinese historian, politician and poet (AD 32–92)

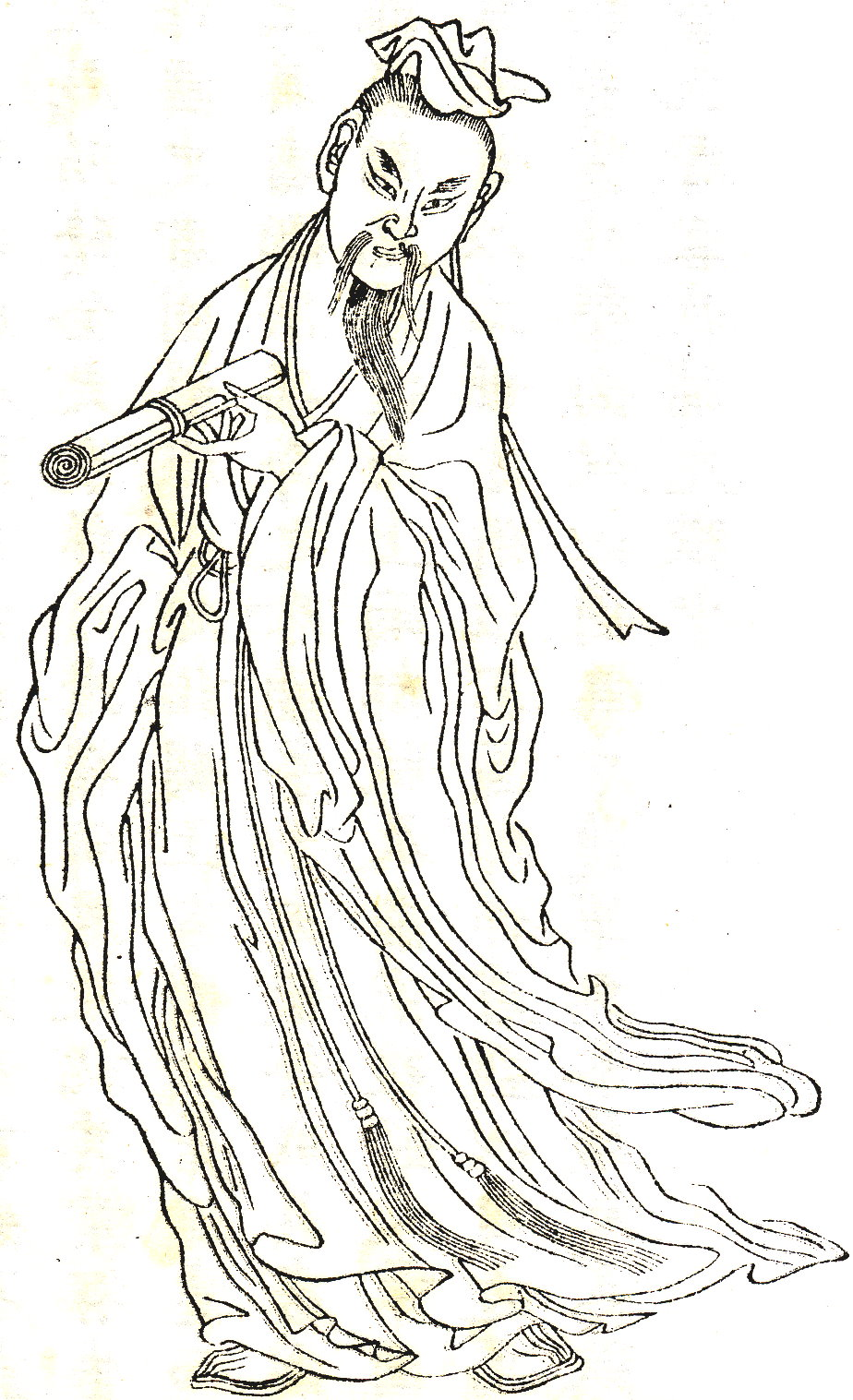
- Ban Gu, 1st-century Chinese poet, historian, and compiler of the Book of Han
- Born: AD 32; Anling, Fufeng County, Han dynasty (now Xianyang, Shaanxi)
- Died: AD 92 (aged 59–60)
- Other name: Mengjian
- Occupations: Historian, poet, politician
- Known for: Book of Han
- Relatives: Ban Biao (father); Consort Ban (grand-aunt); Ban Chao (brother); Ban Zhao (sister)

Ban Gu
- "Ban Gu" in Chinese characters
- Chinese: 班固
Transcriptions
Standard Mandarin
- Hanyu Pinyin: Bān Gù
- Gwoyeu Romatzyh: Ban Guh
- Wade–Giles: Pan^{1} Ku^{4}
- IPA: [pán kû]
Yue: Cantonese
- Yale Romanization: Bāan Gu
- Jyutping: Baan^{1} Gu^{3}
- IPA: [pan˥ ku˧]
Southern Min
- Hokkien POJ: Pan Kòo
Middle Chinese
- Middle Chinese: Pæn Kù
Old Chinese
- Baxter–Sagart (2014): *pˤ<r>an [k]ˤa-s

Alternative Chinese name
- Traditional Chinese: 孟堅
- Simplified Chinese: 孟坚
- Literal meaning: 孟(first of siblings)堅(sturdy, similar meaning to given name "固")
Transcriptions
Standard Mandarin
- Hanyu Pinyin: Mèngjiān
- Gwoyeu Romatzyh: Menqjian
- Wade–Giles: Meng^{4}-chien^{1}
Yue: Cantonese
- Yale Romanization: Maahng-gīn
- Jyutping: Maang^{6}-gin^{1}
Southern Min
- Hokkien POJ: Bīng-kian
Middle Chinese
- Middle Chinese: Mæ̀ng-ken
Old Chinese
- Baxter–Sagart (2014): *mˤrang-s kˤin<g>

Ban Gu (AD 31 (Note: This birth year is per Knechtges, who evidently asserted that Ban's biography in Book of the Later Han had a slight error in recording his age, as a birth year of 32 would mean that he was born in the same year as his younger brother Ban Chao.) or 32–92) (Note: Ban Gu's biography in Book of the Later Han recorded that he was 61 (by East Asian reckoning) when he died in the same year as Dou Xian.) was a Chinese historian, poet, and politician best known for his part in compiling the Book of Han, the second of China's 24 dynastic histories. He also wrote a number of fu, a major literary form, part prose and part poetry, which is particularly associated with the Han era. A number of Ban's fu were collected by Xiao Tong in the Wen Xuan.

== Family background ==
The Ban family was one of the most distinguished families of the Eastern Han dynasty. They lived in the state of Chu during the Warring States period but, during the reign of the First Emperor, a man named Ban Yi (斑 or 班壹, Bān Yī) fled north to the Loufan (simplified Chinese: 楼烦; traditional Chinese: 樓煩; pinyin: Lóufán) near the Yanmen Pass in what is now northern Shanxi Province. By the early Han Dynasty, Ban Gu's ancestors gained prominence on the northwestern frontier as herders of several thousand cattle, oxen, and horses, which they traded in a formidable business and encouraged other families to move to the frontier. Ban Biao later moved the family to Anling (near modern Xianyang, Shaanxi).

Ban Gu's great-aunt Consort Ban was a scholar and poet, and his father Ban Biao was a prominent historian. He took over from his father responsibility for writing a history of the former Han dynasty, a book known in modern times as the Hanshu or Book of Han. However, his work was interrupted by political problems, as his association with the family of Empress Dowager Dou led to his imprisonment and death (either by execution or torture). A few volumes of his book in 13–20th (eight chronological charts) and 26th (astronomical biography), however, was completed by his younger sister, Ban Zhao, and became a model for many other works about later dynasties.

Ban's twin brother Ban Chao was a famous military leader and explorer of Central Asia. His sister, Ban Zhao, was one of the most famous female scholars in Chinese history, and contributed to the Han Shu, after Ban Gu's imprisonment and subsequent death. It has been argued that Ban Gu's paternal grandmother was of Xiongnu ancestry.

== Life ==
Ban's father, Ban Biao, died in AD 54 when Ban was twenty-two. After his father's death, Ban spent a period of time pondering what path he should pursue in life, eventually composing a long fu on his situation entitled "Fu on Communicating with the Hidden" (幽通賦; Yōutōng fù), which is famous as one of the earliest known fu used to discuss philosophical questions. Ban did not immediately begin an official career, but remained in the Ban family home in Anling to work on the completion of his father's historical sequel to Sima Qian's Records of the Grand Historian.

Around AD 60, rumors were reported to Emperor Ming of Han that Ban was "privately revising the national history", which caused the imperial court to become concerned about the type of account Ban would write of the fall of the Western Han and the rise of the Eastern Han. Ban was subsequently arrested and the Ban family library confiscated, though Ban's brother Ban Chao was able to intercede on his behalf and secure Ban's release. Ban was assigned to compile the annals of Emperor Guangwu of Han, the first Eastern Han emperor, and in AD 64 was assigned to the collation of books in the imperial library and promoted to the rank of gentleman. Emperor Ming was so impressed with the quality of Ban's work that in AD 66 he gave him permission to resume his work on the history of the Western Han, which he worked on for the rest of his life.

Ban continued to serve in the imperial library and at the imperial court throughout the second half of the 1st century AD. During the reign of Emperor Zhang of Han, Ban was promoted to the position of "Marshal of the Black Warrior Gate". Ban later served as a high-ranking literary official under Dou Xian, the brother of Emperor Zhang's empress. Although Dou won prestige for two successful campaigns against the Xiongnu, in AD 92 he was suspected by Emperor He of Han of plotting a rebellion and forced to commit suicide. Immediately thereafter, Ban was dismissed from office and arrested by an old rival, Chong Jing, who was serving as the prefect of Luoyang. Ban died in prison that same year at 61 years old.

== Legacy ==
The geographical chapter in the Han History set the trend for including such chapters in standard histories. It is one of the most important texts in the history of geographical writing in China, and was an influence of the later development gazetteer in ancient China.

It has been argued that tendency of scholars to view China's history in a dynastic framework is a direct result of Ban Gu's decision to write the Book of Han in the manner in which he did (though see Mandate of Heaven).

== Ban family ==
- Ban Biao (班彪; 3–54; father)
  - Ban Gu (班固; 32–92; first son)
  - Ban Chao (班超; 32–102; second son)
    - Ban Xiong (班雄; ?–after 107; Ban Chao's eldest son)
      - Ban Shi (班始; ?–130; Ban Xiong's son)
    - Ban Yong (班勇; ?–c. 128; youngest son of Ban Chao)
  - Ban Zhao (班昭; c. 45 – c. 117; daughter)

== See also ==
- Han poetry
- Twenty-Four Histories
