= Ban Zhao =

Late 1st/early 2nd century Chinese historian, philosopher and scholar

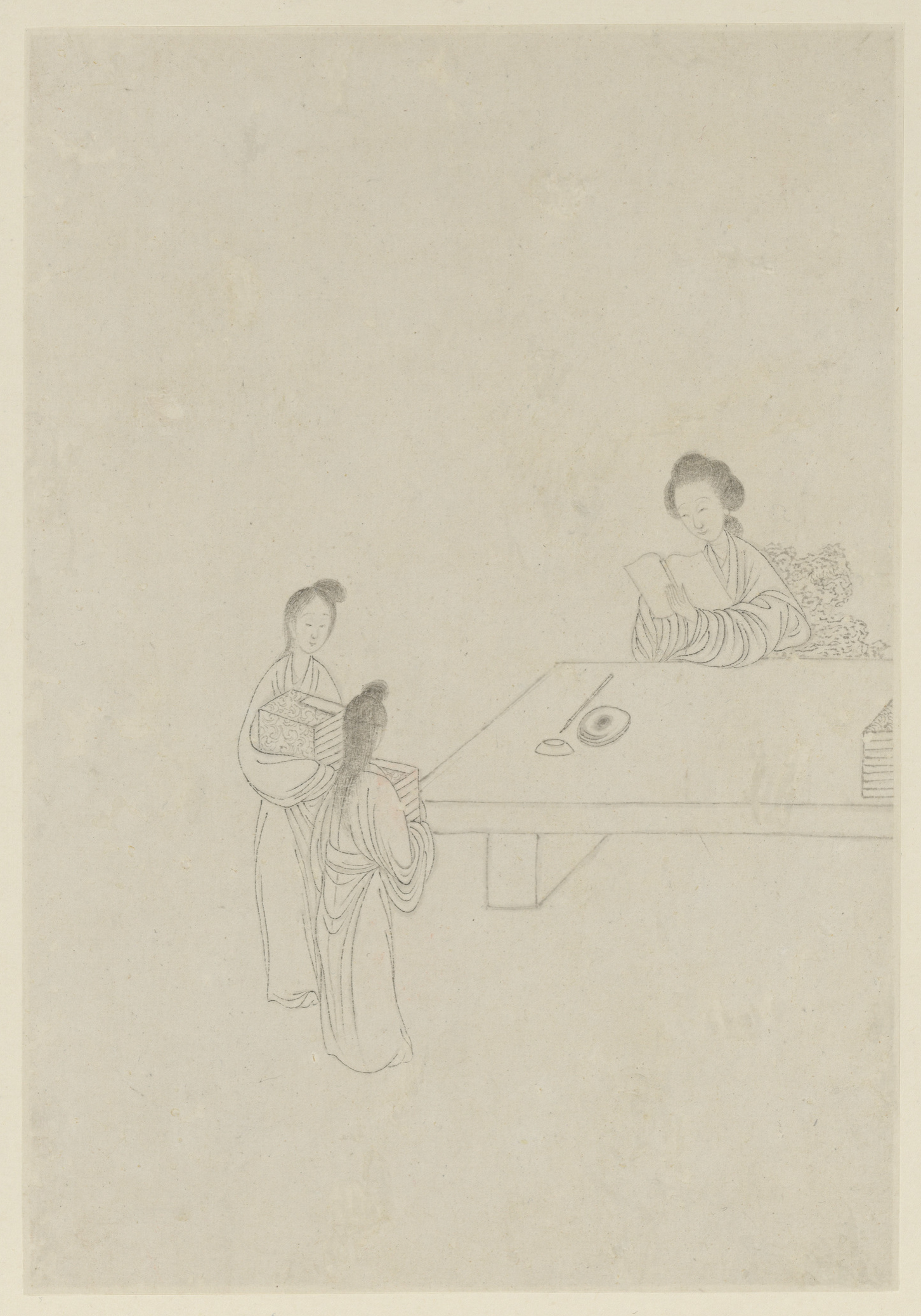
- Ban Zhao, as painted by Gai Qi, 1799
- Born: AD 45 or 49; Anling, near Xianyang, Han China
- Died: 120 (aged 70–71); China
- Spouse: Cao Shishu
- Parent: Ban Biao
- Relatives: Ban Chao (brother); Ban Gu (brother)

Ban Zhao
- Chinese: 班昭
Transcriptions
Standard Mandarin
- Hanyu Pinyin: Bān Zhāo
- Wade–Giles: Pan^{1} Chao^{1}
- IPA: [pán ʈʂáʊ]
Yue: Cantonese
- Yale Romanization: Bāan Chīu
- Jyutping: Baan^{1} Ciu^{1}
Middle Chinese
- Middle Chinese: /pˠan t͡ɕiᴇu/

Alternative Chinese name
- Chinese: 惠班
- Literal meaning: Ban the Kind
Transcriptions
Standard Mandarin
- Hanyu Pinyin: Huìbān
- Wade–Giles: Hui^{4}-Pan^{1}
- IPA: [xwêɪ.pán]
Middle Chinese
- Middle Chinese: /ɦwei^{H} pˠan/

Second alternative Chinese name
- Chinese: 曹大家
- Literal meaning: Venerable Madame Cao
Transcriptions
Standard Mandarin
- Hanyu Pinyin: Cáo Dàgū
Middle Chinese
- Middle Chinese: /d͡zɑu dɑi^{H} kuo/

Ban Zhao (Chinese: 班昭; 45 or 49 – c. 117/120 CE), courtesy name Huiban (Chinese: 惠班), was a Chinese historian, philosopher, and politician. She was the first known female Chinese historian and, along with Pamphile of Epidaurus, one of the first known female historians. She completed her brother Ban Gu's work on the history of the Western Han, the Book of Han. She also wrote Lessons for Women, an influential work on women's conduct. She also had great interest in astronomy and mathematics and wrote poems, commemorative writings, argumentations, commentaries, essays and several longer works, not all of which survive. She became China's most famous female scholar and an instructor of Taoist sexual practices for the imperial family. Ban Zhao is depicted in the Wu Shuang Pu (無雙譜, Table of Peerless Heroes) by Jin Guliang.

== Family ==
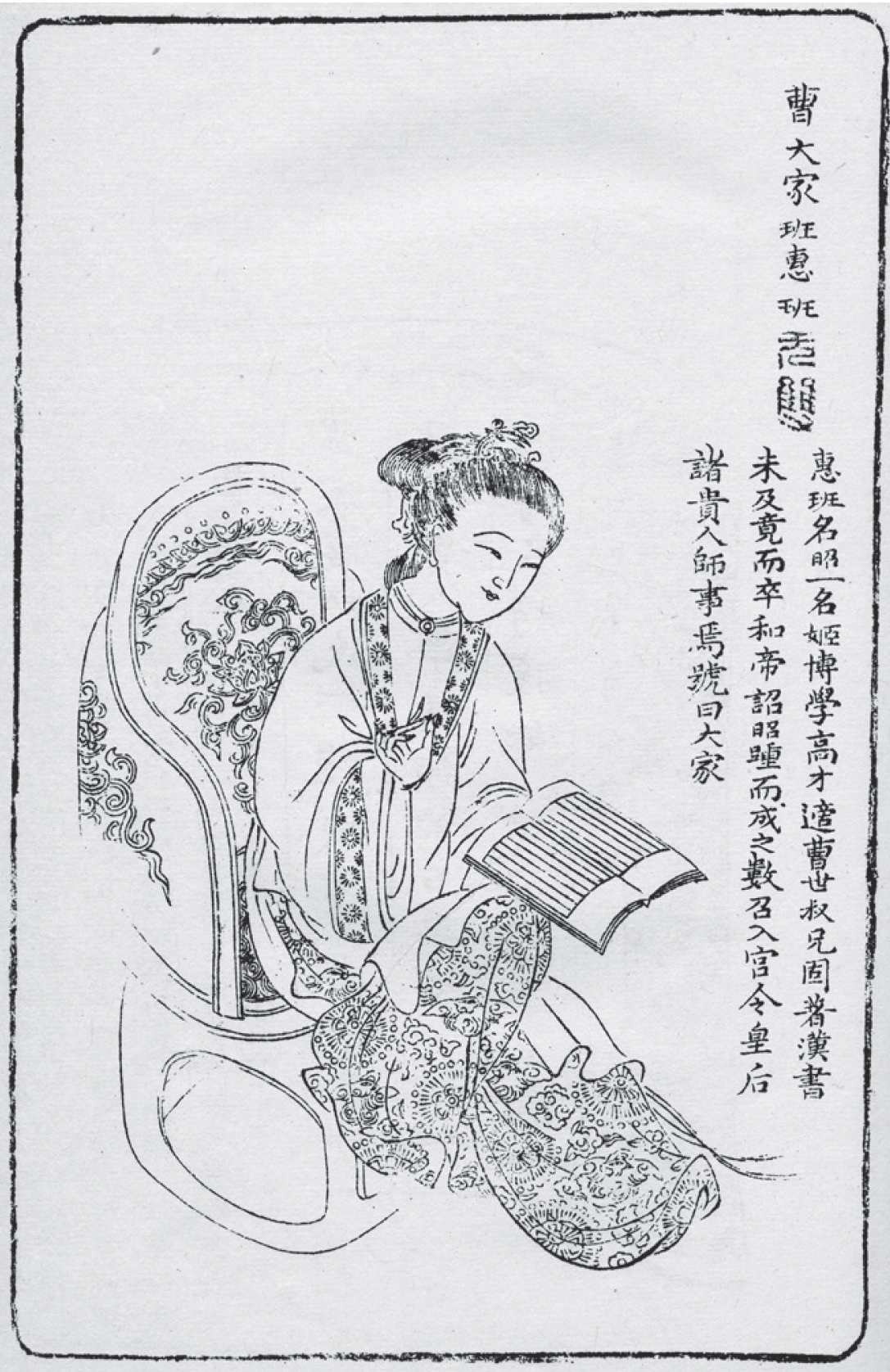
Ban Zhao as depicted in the Wu Shuang Pu (無雙譜, preface 1690) by Jin Guliang

Ban Zhao was born in Anling, near modern Xianyang, Shaanxi province. At age fourteen, she married a local resident named Cao Shishu and was called in the court by the name as Venerable Madame Cao (曹大家). Her husband died when she was still young. She never remarried, instead devoting her life to scholarship. She was the daughter of the famous historian Ban Biao and younger sister of the general Ban Chao and of historian Ban Gu. She was also the granddaughter of Han official Ban Zhi, and the grandniece of the notable scholar and poet Consort Ban.

== Work ==
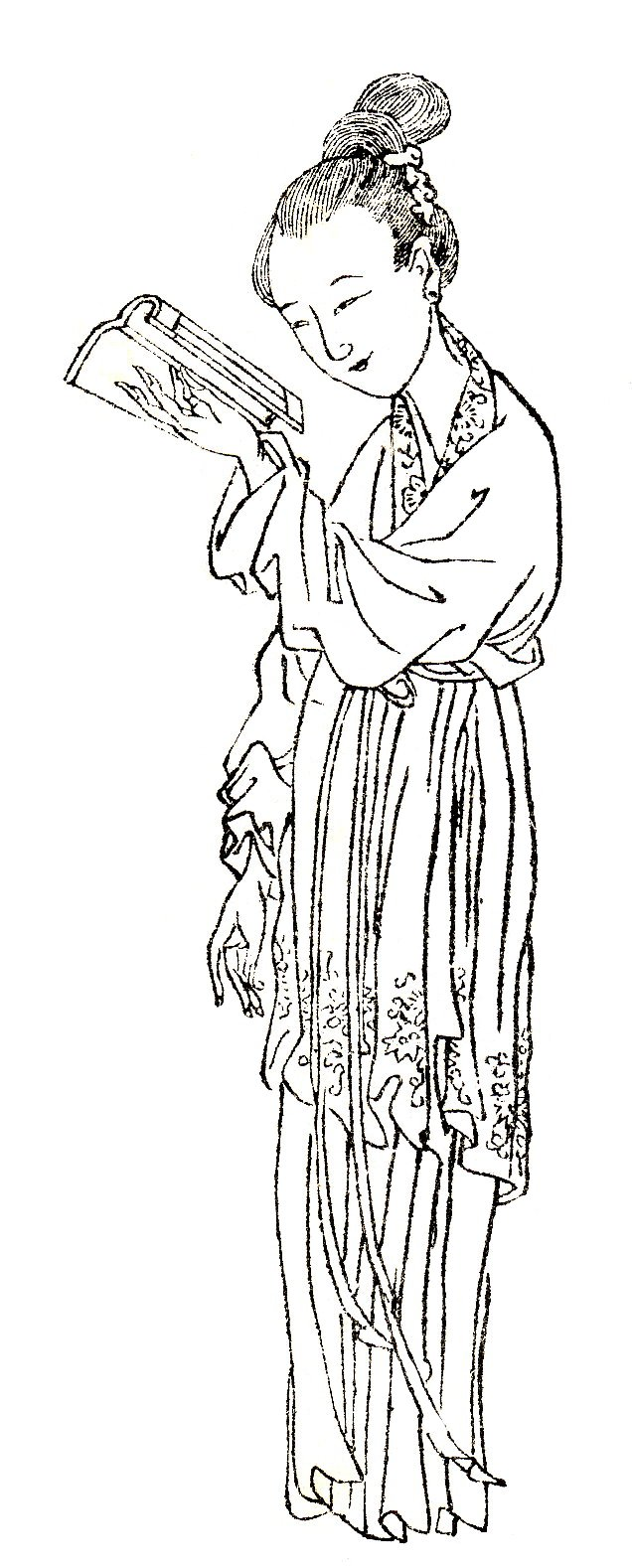
Image of Ban Zhao by Shangguan Zhou (上官周, b. 1665)

Ban Zhao contributed greatly to the completion and transmission of Hanshu (漢書, literally the "Book of the [Former] Han"), the official dynastic history of the Western Han. After Ban Gu was imprisoned and died in 92 because of his association with the family of Empress Dowager Dou, Ban Zhao helped finish the work by making up for the missing part of the Babiao (八表 Eight Tables). She added the genealogy of the mother of the emperor, providing much information which was not usually kept. Later, Ma Xu added a treatise on astronomy (天文志), making Hanshu a complete work.

Ban Zhao also wrote the Lessons for Women. This treatise on the education of women was dedicated to the daughters in Ban Zhao's family but was circulated immediately at court. It was popular for centuries in China as a guide for women's conduct.

Some modern interpretations of Lessons for Women claim that it is a founding text of Confucian feminism. One study asserts that it establishes a "different concept of agency... forged out of the powerlessness of individual women, which is familial, communal, indirect, and conferred by others." Such attitudes towards Zhao's work have roots in the Qing Dynasty, in which some praised Zhao as an example for Chinese women to get an education. Others, however, have argued that Ban Zhao's assertions of the value of a woman's mediocrity and servile behavior in Lessons for Women are incompatible with feminism and that attempts to present her as a feminist are misplaced. Since her text presents a woman's main task as submission to a husband or father and dismisses the significance of women's intelligence or talent, this has been seen as a Confucian endorsement of injustice against women.

She taught Empress Deng Sui and members of the court in the royal library, which gained her political influence. The Empress and concubines gave her the title Gifted one and the empress made her a Lady-in-waiting. As the Empress became regent for the infant Emperor Shang of Han, she often sought the advice of Ban Zhao. In gratitude, the Empress gave both Ban Zhao's sons appointments as officials. Ban Zhao was also a librarian at court, supervising the editorial labors of a staff of assistants and training other scholars in her work. In this capacity, she rearranged and enlarged the Biographies of Eminent Women by Liu Xiang. It is possible that she supervised the copying of manuscripts from bamboo slips and silk onto a recently invented material, paper.

In 113, Ban Zhao's son Cao Cheng (曹成) was appointed an official in Chenliu Commandery. Ban accompanied him to Chenliu and wrote about the journey in Dong Zheng Fu (東征賦), which has survived. After her death, her daughter-in-law, née Ding, gathered her works in the three-volume Collected Works of Ban Zhao, but most have been lost.

== Legacy ==
The Ban Zhao crater on Venus is named after her.

== Family ==
- Ban Biao (班彪; 3-54; father)
  - Ban Gu (班固; 32–92; eldest brother)
  - Ban Chao (班超; 32–102; second brother)
    - Ban Xiong (班雄; ?-after 107; Ban Chao's eldest son)
    - Ban Shi (班始; ?-130; Ban Chao's second son)
    - Ban Yong (班勇; ?-after 127; Ban Chao's youngest son)

== See also ==
- Book of Han
- Pamphile of Epidaurus, a contemporary female Greco-Roman historian of Roman Egypt
