= Gan Ying =

Late first century Chinese military ambassador

Gan Ying (Chinese: 甘英; pinyin: Gān Yīng; fl. 97 CE) was a Chinese diplomat, explorer, and military official who was sent on a mission to the Roman Empire to find out more about it in 97 CE by the Chinese military general Ban Chao.

Gan Ying did not reach Rome, only traveling to as far as the "western sea" which could refer to either the eastern coast of the Mediterranean Sea, the Black Sea, or the Parthian coast of the Persian Gulf. From there he could have followed the Euphrates north to the Roman border in Syria in a few weeks, but he did not know this and instead he planned to sail around Arabia to Roman Egypt, which would have taken 3 months. Becoming discouraged by local sailors' stories of bad weather, he gave up and went home. Gan Ying may have reached Adulis in modern day Ethiopia, due to a mention of 'Dou-Le' which phonetically sounds like Adulis. He is said to have brought an envoy back from Dou-Le to Luoyang.

== Hou Hanshu ==
According to the book Hou Hanshu

"In the ninth year [97 CE], Ban Chao sent his Subordinate Gan Ying, who probed as far as the Western Sea [which was either the Persian Gulf or the Black Sea.] and then returned. Former generations never reached these regions. The Shanjing gives no details on them. Undoubtedly he prepared a report on their customs and investigated their precious and unusual [products]."

"In the ninth Yongyuan year [97 CE], during the reign of the Emperor He, Protector General Ban Chao sent Gan Ying to Da Qin (大秦) [the Roman Empire]. He reached Tiaozhi (条支) (Characene) and Sibin (斯宾) (Susiana?) next to a large sea. He wanted to cross it, but the sailors of the western frontier of Anxi (安息) [Parthia] said to him:

"The ocean is huge. Those making the round trip can do it in three months if the winds are favourable. However, if you encounter winds that delay you, it can take two years. That is why all the men who go by sea take stores for three years. The vast ocean urges men to think of their country, and get homesick, and some of them die."

When [Gan] Ying heard this, he discontinued (his trip).

The Hou Hanshu also recorded:

"[Roman] territory extends for several thousands of li. It has more than four hundred walled towns. There are several tens of smaller dependent kingdoms. The walls of the towns are made of stone. They have established postal relays at intervals, which are all plastered and whitewashed. There are pines and cypresses, as well as trees and plants of all kinds."

== Description of Rome ==
Gan Ying also gave the following description of Roman customs and natural products:

"Their kings are not permanent. They select and appoint the most worthy man. If there are unexpected calamities in the kingdom, such as frequent extraordinary winds or rains, he is unceremoniously rejected and replaced. The one who has been dismissed quietly accepts his demotion, and is not angry. The people of this country are all tall and honest. They resemble the people of the Middle Kingdom and that is why this kingdom is called Da Qin [or 'Great China']. This country produces plenty of gold [and] silver, [and of] rare and precious [things] they have luminous jade, 'bright moon pearls,' Haiji rhinoceroses, coral, yellow amber, opaque glass, whitish chalcedony, red cinnabar, green gemstones, goldthread embroideries, rugs woven with gold thread, delicate polychrome silks painted with gold, and asbestos cloth. They also have a fine cloth which some people say is made from the down of 'water sheep,' but which is made, in fact, from the cocoons of wild silkworms. They blend all sorts of fragrances, and by boiling the juice, make a compound perfume. [They have] all the precious and rare things that come from the various foreign kingdoms. They make gold and silver coins. Ten silver coins are worth one gold coin. They trade with Anxi [Parthia] and Tianzhu [Northwest India] by sea. The profit margin is ten to one. ... The king of this country always wanted to send envoys to Han, but Anxi [Parthia], wishing to control the trade in multi-coloured Chinese silks, blocked the route to prevent [the Romans] getting through [to China]."

== Analysis ==
Henry Yule notes that it ended with a detailed description of the Mediterranean coral industry. Gan Ying traveled about the time that the Emperor Nerva adopted Trajan as his successor, but neither of them abdicated for bad omens; the "kings" according to him resemble the Sages of legendary Chinese antiquity more than any Roman institution.

The silkworms of the Greek island of Cos were cultivated in antiquity, but the product was never comparable to Chinese silk. However, this reference appears to be to the very rare and beautifully golden sea silk, which is also referred to in the 3rd century history, the Weilüe.

== See also ==
- Battle of Yiwulu
- Sino-Roman relations

== Sources ==
- "The Roman Empire in Chinese sources", Leslie and Gardiner, Rome, Bardi, 1996.
- Hill, John E. 2004. The Peoples of the West from the Weilüe 魏略 by Yu Huan 魚豢: A Third Century Chinese Account Composed between 239 and 265 CE. Draft annotated English translation.
- Hill, John E. (2009) Through the Jade Gate to Rome: A Study of the Silk Routes during the Later Han Dynasty, 1st to 2nd Centuries CE. BookSurge, Charleston, South Carolina. ISBN 978-1-4392-2134-1.
- "The Silk Road", Frances Wood, University of California Press, ISBN 0-520-24340-4
- Yu, Taishan. 2004. A History of the Relationships between the Western and Eastern Han, Wei, Jin, Northern and Southern Dynasties and the Western Regions. Sino-Platonic Papers No. 131 March, 2004. Dept. of East Asian Languages and Civilizations, University of Pennsylvania.
