= Book of Han =

History of the Western Han dynasty (111 CE)

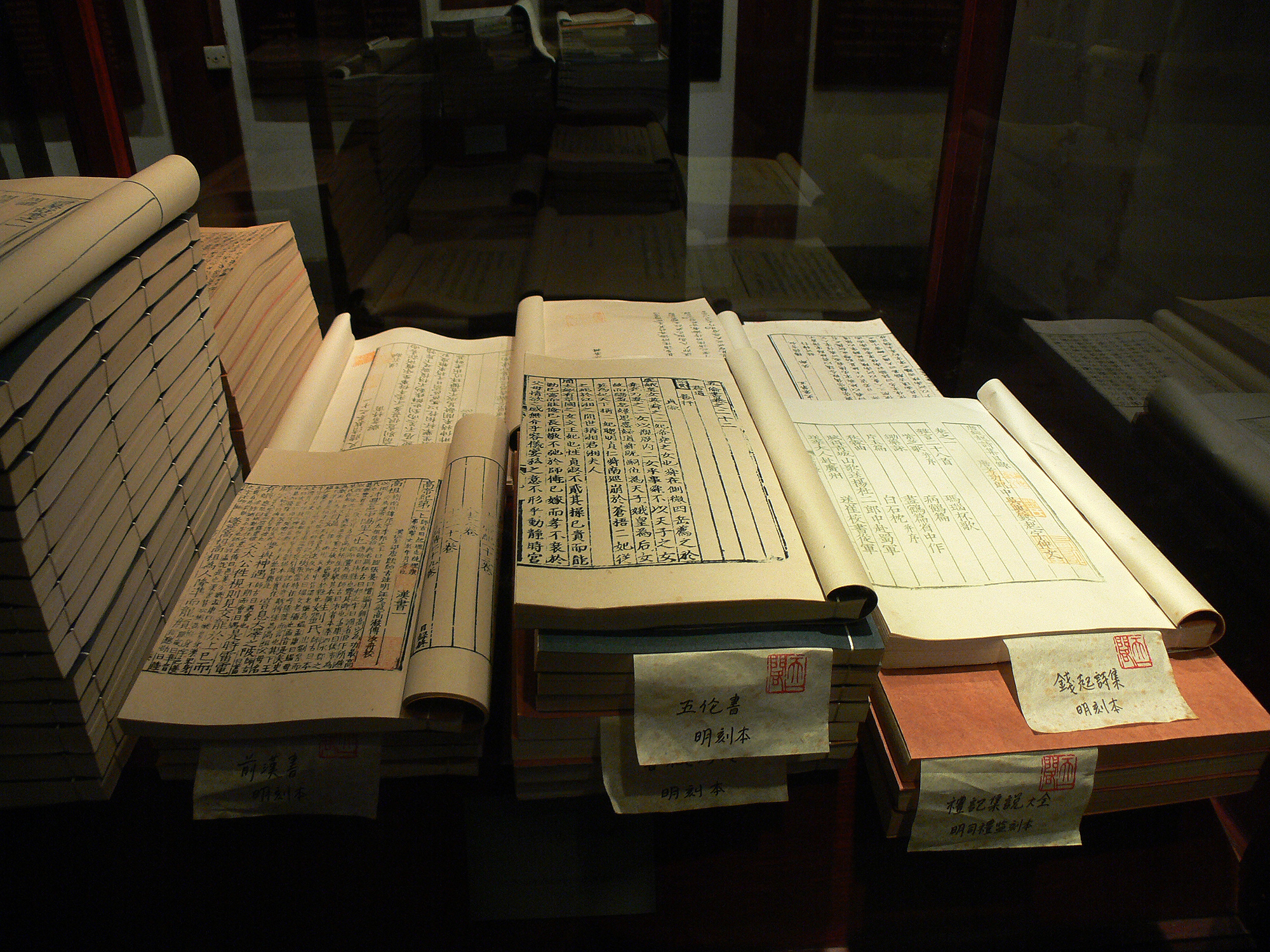
- Traditional Chinese: 漢書
- Simplified Chinese: 汉书
- Hanyu Pinyin: Hàn shū
Transcriptions
Standard Mandarin
- Hanyu Pinyin: Hàn shū
- Wade–Giles: Han^{4} shu^{1}
- IPA: [xân ʂú]
Yue: Cantonese
- Yale Romanization: Hon syū
- Jyutping: Hon3 syu1
Southern Min
- Tâi-lô: Hàn-tsu (col.); Hàn-su (lit.)
Middle Chinese
- Middle Chinese: xàn sho
Old Chinese
- Baxter–Sagart (2014): *n̥ˤar-s s-ta

The Book of Han (Chinese: 漢書), finished in 111 CE, is one of the Twenty-Four Histories and covers the Western, or Former Han dynasty from the first emperor in 206 BCE to the fall of Wang Mang in 23 CE. The work was composed by Ban Gu (32–92 CE), an Eastern Han court official, with the help of his sister Ban Zhao, continuing the work of their father, Ban Biao. They modelled their work on the Records of the Grand Historian (c. 91 BCE), a cross-dynastic general history, but theirs was the first in this annals-biography form to cover a single dynasty. It is the best source, sometimes the only one, for many topics such as literature in this period. The Book of Han is also called the Book of the Former Han (前漢書; Qián Hàn shū) to distinguish it from the Book of the Later Han (後漢書; Hòu Hàn shū) which covers the Eastern Han period (25–220 CE), and was composed in the fifth century by Fan Ye (398–445 CE).

== Contents ==
This history developed from a continuation of Sima Qian's Records of the Grand Historian, initiated by Ban Gu's father, Ban Biao, at the beginning of the Later Han dynasty. This work is usually referred to as Later Traditions (後傳), which indicates that the elder Ban's work was meant to be a continuation. Other scholars of the time, including Liu Xin and Yang Xiong also worked on continuations of Sima's history. After Ban Biao's death, his eldest son Ban Gu was dissatisfied with what his father had completed, and he began a new history that started with the beginning of the Han dynasty. This distinguished it from Sima Qian's history, which had begun with China's earliest legendary rulers. In this way, Ban Gu initiated the Jizhuanti (紀傳體) format for dynastic histories that was to remain the model for the official histories until modern times.

For the periods where they overlapped, Ban Gu adopted nearly verbatim much of Sima Qian's material, though in some cases he also expanded it. He also incorporated at least some of what his father had written, though it is difficult to know how much. The completed work ran to a total of 100 fascicles (卷), and included essays on law, science, geography, and literature. Ban Gu's younger sister Ban Zhao finished writing the book in 111, 19 years after Ban Gu had died in prison. An outstanding scholar in her own right, she is thought to have written volumes 13–20 (eight chronological tables) and 26 (treatise on astronomy), the latter with the help of Ma Xu. As with the Records of the Grand Historian, Zhang Qian, a notable Chinese general who travelled to the west, was a key source for the cultural and socio-economic data on the Western Regions contained in the 96th fascicle. The "Annals" section and the three chapters covering the reign of Wang Mang were translated into English by Homer H. Dubs. Other chapters have been rendered into English by A. F. P. Hulsewé, Clyde B. Sargent, Nancy Lee Swann, and Burton Watson.

The text includes a description of the Triple Concordance Calendar System (三統曆) developed by Liu Xin in fascicle 21. This is translated to English by Cullen.

Ban Gu's history set the standard for the writings of later Chinese dynasties, and today it is a reference used to study the Han period. It is regarded as one of the "Four Histories" (四史) of the Twenty-Four Histories canon, together with the Records of the Grand Historian, Records of the Three Kingdoms and History of the Later Han.

=== Annals ===
Ji (紀, annal), 12 volumes. Emperors' biographies in strict annal form, which offer a chronological overview of the most important occurrences, as seen from the imperial court.

Number	Title (Chinese)	Title (English)
Volume 1 (Part 1), Volume 1 (Part 2)	高帝紀	Annals of Emperor Gaozu, 206–195 BCE
Volume 2	惠帝紀	Annals of Emperor Hui, 194–188 BCE
Volume 3	高后紀	Annals of Empress Lü Zhi, 188–180 BCE
Volume 4	文帝紀	Annals of Emperor Wen, 179–157 BCE
Volume 5	景帝紀	Annals of Emperor Jing, 156–141 BCE
Volume 6	武帝紀	Annals of Emperor Wu, 140–87 BCE
Volume 7	昭帝紀	Annals of Emperor Zhao, 86–74 BCE
Volume 8	宣帝紀	Annals of Emperor Xuan, 73–49 BCE
Volume 9	元帝紀	Annals of Emperor Yuan, 48–33 BCE
Volume 10	成帝紀	Annals of Emperor Cheng, 32–7 BCE
Volume 11	哀帝紀	Annals of Emperor Ai, 6–1 BCE
Volume 12	平帝紀	Annals of Emperor Ping, 1 BCE – 5 CE

=== Chronological tables ===
Biao (表, tables), 8 volumes. Chronological tables of important people.

Number	Title (Chinese)	Title (English)
Volume 13	異姓諸侯王表	Table of nobles not related to the imperial clan
Volume 14	諸侯王表	Table of nobles related to the imperial clan
Volume 15	王子侯表	Table of sons of nobles
Volume 16	高惠高后文功臣表	Table of meritorious officials during the reigns of (Emperors) Gao, Hui, Wen and Empress Gao
Volume 17	景武昭宣元成功臣表	Table of meritorious officials during the reigns of (Emperors) Jing, Wu, Zhao, Xuan, Yuan and Cheng
Volume 18	外戚恩澤侯表	Table of nobles from families of the imperial consorts
Volume 19	百官公卿表	Table of nobility ranks and government offices
Volume 20	古今人表	Prominent people from the past until the present

=== Treatises ===
Zhi (志, memoirs), 10 volumes. Each treatise describes an area of effort of the state.

Number	Title (Chinese)	Title (English)
Volume 21	律曆志	Treatise on Rhythm and the Calendar
Volume 22	禮樂志	Treatise on Rites and Music
Volume 23	刑法志	Treatise on Punishment and Law
Volume 24 (Part 1), Volume 24 (Part 2)	食貨志	Treatise on Foodstuffs
Volume 25 (Part 1), Volume 25 (Part 2)	郊祀志	Treatise on Sacrifices
Volume 26	天文志	Treatise on Astronomy
Volume 27 (Part 1), Volume 27 (Part 2), Volume 27 (Part 3), Volume 27 (Part 4), Volume 27 (Part 5)	五行志	Treatise on the Five Elements
Volume 28 (Part 1), Volume 28 (Part 2)	地理志	Treatise on Geography
Volume 29	溝洫志	Treatise on Rivers and Canals
Volume 30	藝文志	Treatise on Literature

=== Biographies ===
Zhuan (傳, exemplary traditions, usually translated as biographies), 70 volumes. Biographies of important people. The biographies confine themselves to the description of events that clearly show the exemplary character of the person. Two or more people are treated in one main article, as they belong to the same class of people. The last articles describe the relations between China and the various peoples at and beyond the frontiers, including the contested areas of Ba in present-day Yunnan; Nanyue in present-day Guangdong, Guangxi, and Vietnam; and Minyue in present-day Fujian.

Number	Title (Chinese)	Title (English)
Volume 31	陳勝項籍傳	Chen Sheng and Xiang Yu
Volume 32	張耳陳餘傳	Zhang Er and Chen Yu
Volume 33	魏豹田儋韓王信傳	Wei Bao, Tian Dan and Hán Xin (King of Han)
Volume 34	韓彭英盧吳傳	Han, Peng, Ying, Lu and Wu – Han Xin, Peng Yue, Ying Bu, Lu Wan and Wu Rui (吳芮)
Volume 35	荊燕吳傳	the Princes of Jing, Yan and Wu
Volume 36	楚元王傳	Prince Yuan of Chu – Liu Xiang and Liu Xin
Volume 37	季布欒布田叔傳	Ji Bu, Luan Bu and Tian Shu
Volume 38	高五王傳	the five sons of Emperor Gao
Volume 39	蕭何曹參傳	Xiao He and Cao Shen
Volume 40	張陳王周傳	Zhang, Chen, Wang and Zhou – Zhang Liang, Chen Ping, Wang Ling (王陵) and Zhou Bo
Volume 41	樊酈滕灌傅靳周傳	Fan, Li, Teng, Guan, Fu, Jin and Zhou – Fan Kuai, Li Shang (酈商), Xiahou Ying, Guan Ying (灌嬰), Fu Kuan, Jin She (靳歙) and Zhou Xue (周緤)
Volume 42	張周趙任申屠傳	Zhang, Zhou, Zhao, Ren and Shentu – Zhang Cang (張蒼), Zhou Chang (周昌), Zhao Yao (趙堯), Ren Ao (任敖) and Shentu Jia (申屠嘉)
Volume 43	酈陸朱劉叔孫傳	Li, Lu, Zhu, Liu and Shusun – Li Yiji (酈食其), Lu Gu (陸賈), Zhu Jian (朱建), Lou Jing (婁敬) and Shusun Tong (叔孫通)
Volume 44	淮南衡山濟北王傳	the kings of Huainan, Hengshan and Jibei
Volume 45	蒯伍江息夫傳	Kuai, Wu, Jiang and Xifu – Kuai Tong (蒯通), Wu Bei (伍被), Jiang Chong (江充) and Xifu Gong (息夫躬)
Volume 46	萬石衛直周張傳	the lords of Wan, Wei, Zhi, Zhou and Zhang – Shi Fen (石奮), Wei Wan (衛綰), Zhi Buyi (直不疑), Zhou Ren (周仁) and Zhang Ou (張歐)
Volume 47	文三王傳	the three sons of Emperor Wen
Volume 48	賈誼傳	Jia Yi
Volume 49	爰盎晁錯傳	Yuan Ang and Chao Cuo
Volume 50	張馮汲鄭傳	Zhang, Feng, Ji and Zheng – Zhang Shizhi (張釋之), Feng Tang (馮唐), Ji An (汲黯) and Zheng Dangshi (鄭當時)
Volume 51	賈鄒枚路傳	Jia, Zou, Mei and Lu – Jia Shan (賈山, Zou Yang (鄒陽), Mei Cheng (枚乘) and Lu Wenshu (路溫舒)
Volume 52	竇田灌韓傳	Dou, Tian, Guan and Han – Dou Ying (竇嬰), Tian Fen (田蚡), Guan Fu (灌夫) and Han Anguo (韓安國)
Volume 53	景十三王傳	the thirteen sons of Emperor Jing
Volume 54	李廣蘇建傳	Li Guang and Su Jian
Volume 55	衛青霍去病傳	Wei Qing and Huo Qubing
Volume 56	董仲舒傳	Dong Zhongshu
Volume 57 (Part 1), Volume 57 (Part 2)	司馬相如傳	Sima Xiangru
Volume 58	公孫弘卜式兒寬傳	Gongsun Hong, Bu Shi and Er Kuan
Volume 59	張湯傳	Zhang Tang
Volume 60	杜周傳	Du Zhou
Volume 61	張騫李廣利傳	Zhang Qian and Li Guangli
Volume 62	司馬遷傳	Sima Qian
Volume 63	武五子傳	the five sons of Emperor Wu
Volume 64 (Part 1), Volume 64 (Part 2)	嚴朱吾丘主父徐嚴終王賈傳	Yan, Zhu, Wuqiu, Zhufu, Xu, Yan, Zhong, Wang and Jia – Yan Zhu (嚴助), Zhu Maichen (朱買臣), Wuqiu Shouwang (吾丘壽王), Zhufu Yan (主父偃), Xu Yue (徐樂), Yan An (嚴安), Zhong Jun (終軍), Wang Bao (王褒) and Jia Juanzhi (賈捐之); two parts
Volume 65	東方朔傳	Dongfang Shuo
Volume 66	公孫劉田王楊蔡陳鄭傳	Gongsun, Liu, Tian, Wang, Yang, Cai, Chen and Zheng – Gongsun He (公孫賀), Liu Quli (劉屈氂), Tian Qiuqian (田千秋), Wang Xin (王訢), Yang Chang (楊敞), Cai Yi (蔡義), Chen Wannian (陳萬年) and Zheng Hong (鄭弘)
Volume 67	楊胡朱梅云傳	Yang, Hu, Zhu, Mei and Yun – Yang Wangsun (楊王孫), Hu Jian (胡建), Zhu Yun (朱雲), Mei Fu (梅福) and Yun Chang (云敞)
Volume 68	霍光金日磾傳	Huo Guang and Jin Midi
Volume 69	趙充國辛慶忌	Zhao Chongguo and Xin Qingji
Volume 70	傅常鄭甘陳段傳	Fu, Chang, Zheng, Gan, Chen and Duan – Fu Jiezi, Chang Hui (常惠), Zheng Ji, Gan Yannian (甘延壽), Chen Tang and Duan Huizong (段會宗)
Volume 71	雋疏于薛平彭傳	Jun, Shu, Yu, Xue, Ping and Peng – Jun Buyi (雋不疑), Shu Guang (疏廣) and Shu Shou (疏受), Yu Dingguo (于定國), Xue Guangde (薛廣德), Ping Dang (平當) and Peng Xuan (彭宣)
Volume 72	王貢兩龔鮑傳	Wang, Gong, two Gongs and Bao – Wang Ji (王吉), Gong Yu (貢禹), Gong Sheng (龔勝) and Gong She (龔舍) and Bao Xuan
Volume 73	韋賢傳	Wei Xian
Volume 74	魏相丙吉傳	Wei Xiang and Bing Ji
Volume 75	眭兩夏侯京翼李傳	Sui, two Xiahous, Jing, Ji and Li – Sui Hong (眭弘), Xiahou Shichang (夏侯始昌) and Xiahou Sheng (夏侯勝), Jing Fang (京房), Ji Feng (翼奉) and Li Xun (李尋)
Volume 76	趙尹韓張兩王傳	Zhao, Yin, Han, Zhang and two Wangs – Zhao Guanghan (趙廣漢), Yin Wenggui (尹翁歸), Han Yanshou (韓延壽), Zhang Chang (張敞), Wang Zun (王尊) and Wang Zhang (王章)
Volume 77	蓋諸葛劉鄭孫毋將何傳	Gai, Zhuge, Liu, Zheng, Sun, Wujiang and He – Gai: Gai Kuanrao (蓋寬饒), Zhuge: Zhuge Feng (諸葛豐), Liu: Liu Fu (劉輔), Zheng: Zheng Chong (鄭崇), Sun: Sun Bao (孫寶), Wujiang: Wujiang Long (毋將隆), He: He Bing (何並)
Volume 78	蕭望之傳	Xiao Wangzhi
Volume 79	馮奉世傳	Feng Fengshi
Volume 80	宣元六王傳	the six sons of Emperors Xuan and Yuan
Volume 81	匡張孔馬傳	Kuang, Zhang, Kong and Ma – Kuang Heng (匡衡), Zhang Yu (張禹), Kong Guang (孔光) and Ma Gong (馬宮)
Volume 82	王商史丹傅喜傳	Wang Shang, Shi Dan and Fu Xi
Volume 83	薛宣朱博傳	Xue Xuan and Zhu Bo
Volume 84	翟方進傳	Zhai Fangjin
Volume 85	谷永杜鄴傳	Gu Yong and Du Ye
Volume 86	何武王嘉師丹傳	He Wu, Wang Jia and Shi Dan
Volume 87 (Part 1), Volume 87 (Part 2)	揚雄傳	Yang Xiong
Volume 88	儒林傳	Confucian Scholars
Volume 89	循吏傳	Upright Officials
Volume 90	酷吏傳	Cruel Officials
Volume 91	貨殖傳	Usurers
Volume 92	游俠傳	Youxias
Volume 93	佞幸傳	Flatterers
Volume 94 (Part 1), Volume 94 (Part 2)	匈奴傳	Traditions of the Xiongnu
Volume 95	西南夷兩粵朝鮮傳	Traditions of the Yi of the southeast, the two Yues, and Joseon (Korea) – Nanyue and Min Yue
Volume 96 (Part 1), Volume 96 (Part 2)	西域傳	Traditions of the Western Regions
Volume 97 (Part 1), Volume 97 (Part 2)	外戚傳	the Empresses and Imperial Affines
Volume 98	元后傳	Wang Zhengjun
Volume 99 (Part 1), Volume 99 (Part 2), Volume 99 (Part 3)	王莽傳	Wang Mang
Volume 100 (Part 1), Volume 100 (Part 2)	敘傳	Afterword and Family History

=== Mention of Japan ===
The people of Japan make their first unambiguous appearance in written history in this book (Book of Han, Volume 28, Treatise on Geography), in which it is recorded, "The people of Wo are located across the ocean from Lelang Commandery, are divided into more than one hundred tribes, and come to offer tribute from time to time." It is later recorded that in 57, the southern Wa kingdom of Na sent an emissary named Taifu to pay tribute to Emperor Guangwu and received a golden seal. The seal itself was discovered in northern Kyūshū in the 18th century. According to the Book of Wei, the most powerful kingdom on the archipelago in the third century was called Yamatai and was ruled by the legendary Queen Himiko.

=== Commentaries ===
The comments of both Yan Shigu (581–645) and Su Lin are included in the Palace Edition. The Hanshu Buzhu (漢書補注) by Wang Xianqian (1842–1918) contains notes by a number commentators, including Wang himself. Hanshu Kuiguan (漢書管窺) by Yang Shuda is a modern commentary.
