= Society and culture of the Han dynasty =

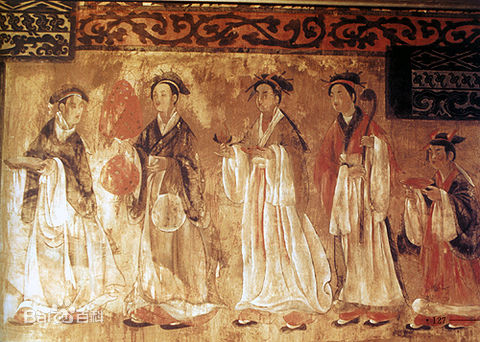
Women dressed in Hanfu silk robes

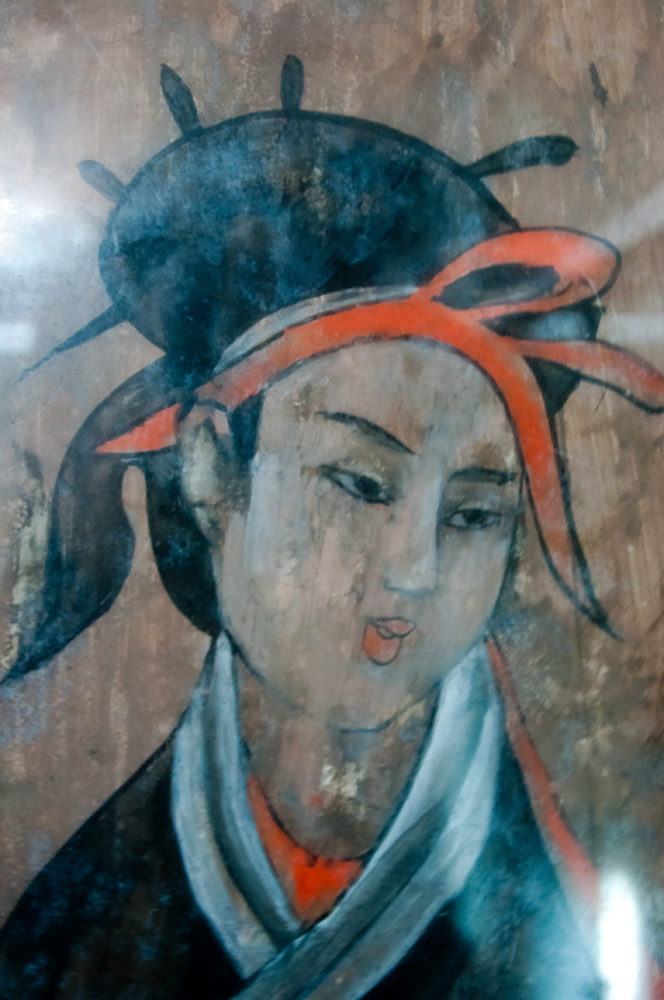
A woman with an Eastern Han hairstyle

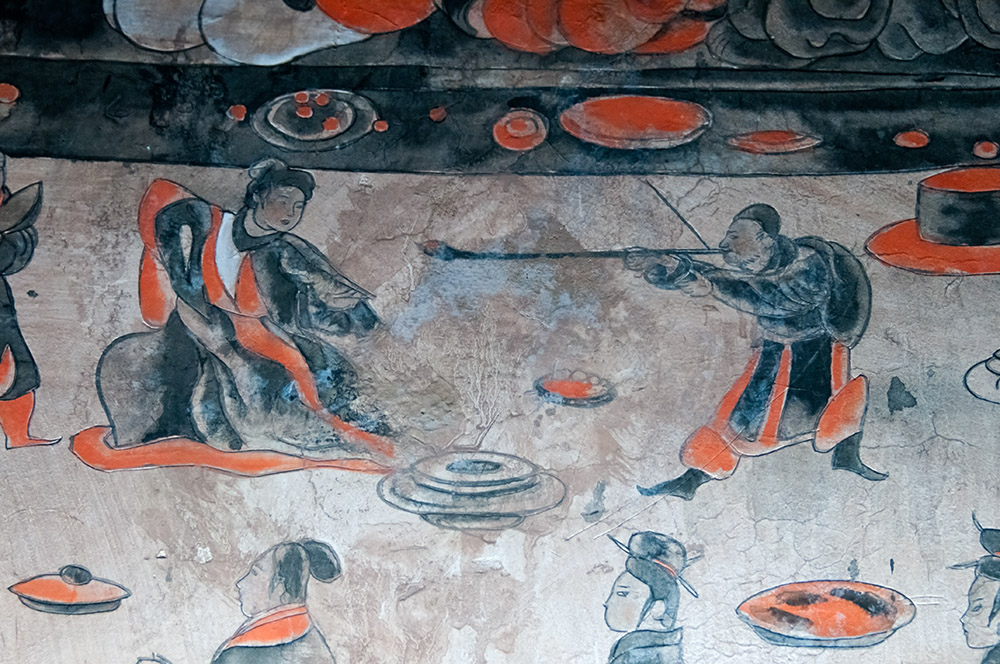
A dancer and musician, detail from a banquet scene

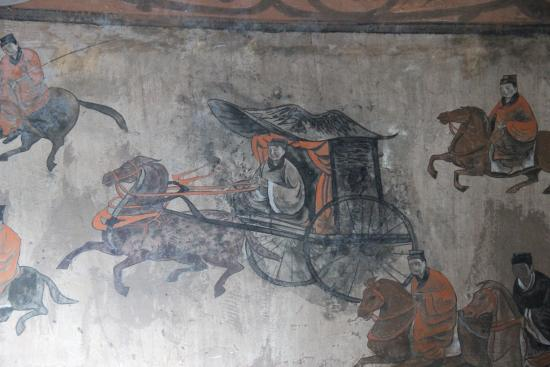
Cavalry and chariots

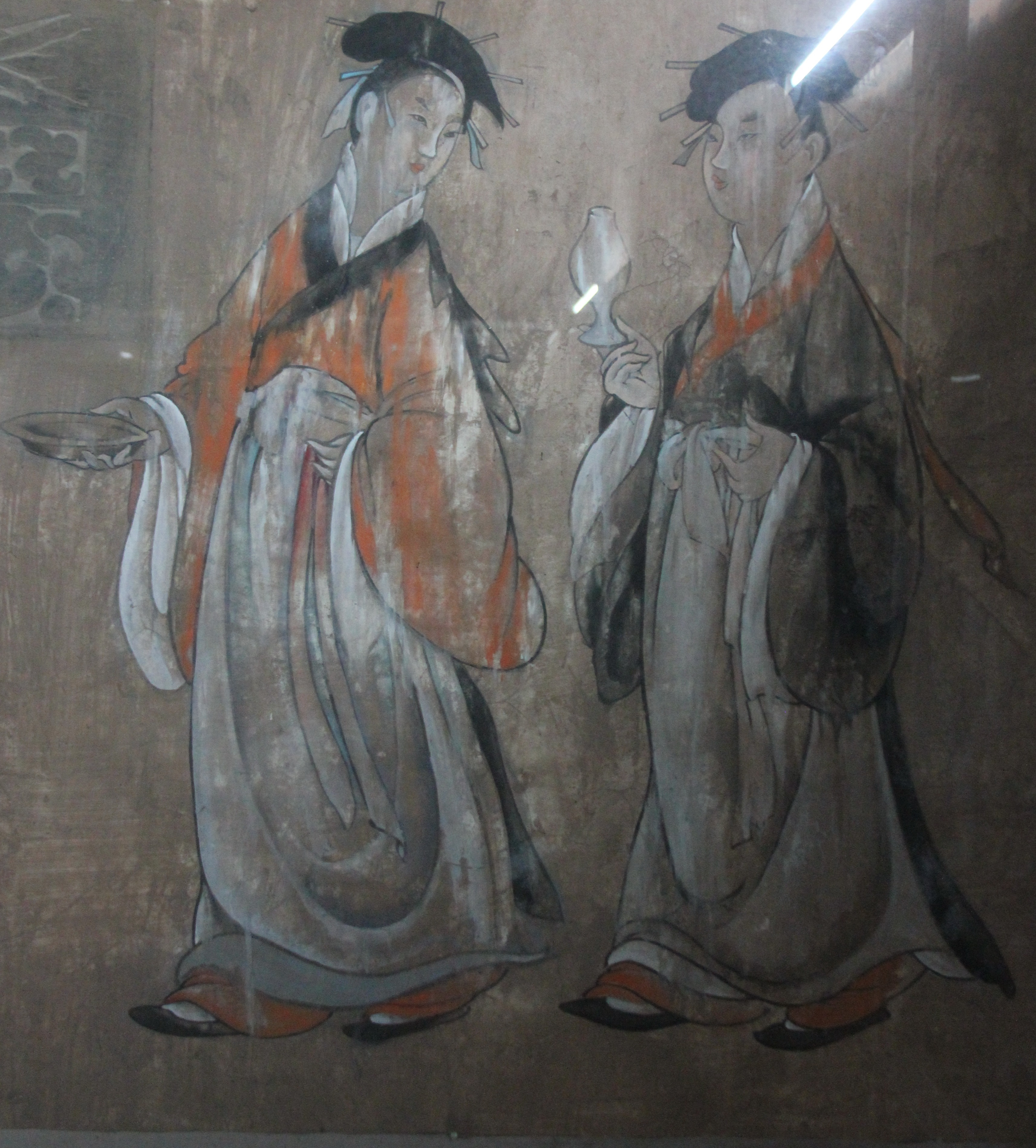
Women (perhaps court attendants) dressed in Hanfu and displaying their domestic wares

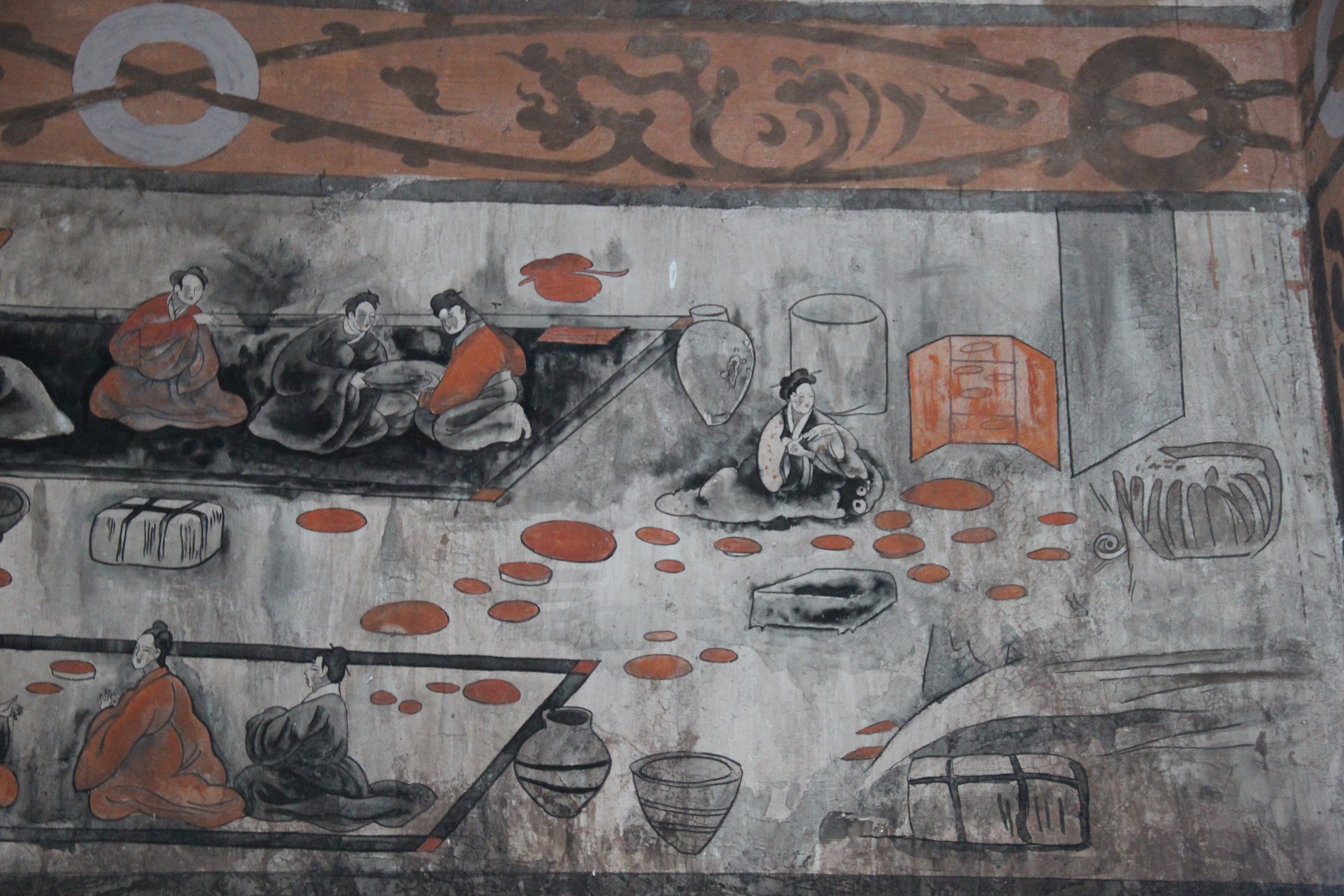
Attendants dressed in Hanfu and displaying their domestic wares

Murals of the Dahuting Tomb (Chinese: 打虎亭汉墓; pinyin: Dahuting Han mu) of the late Eastern Han dynasty (25–220 CE), located in Zhengzhou, Henan province, China, showing scenes of daily life.

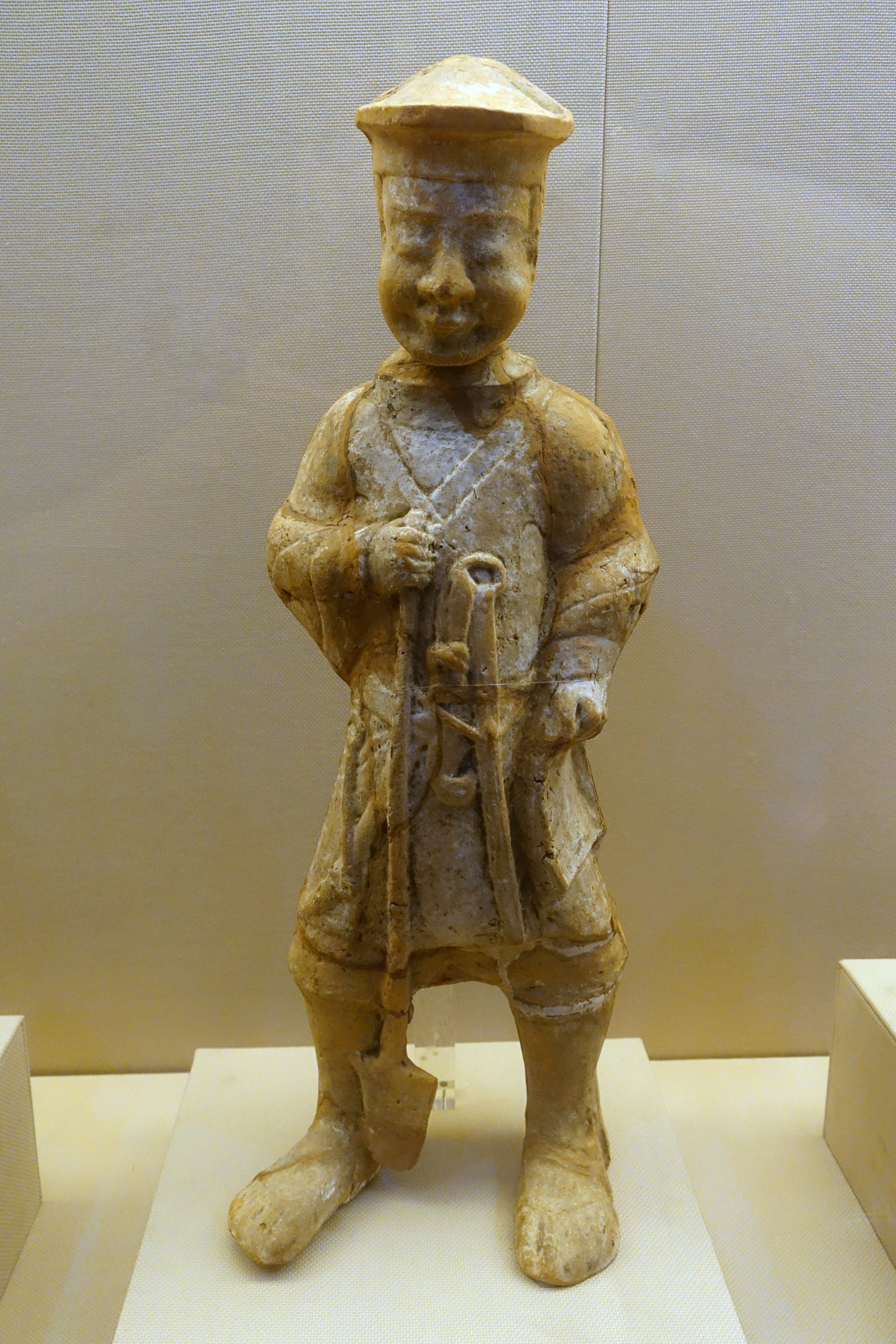
A laborer, unearthed from a tomb of Xinjin County, Sichuan

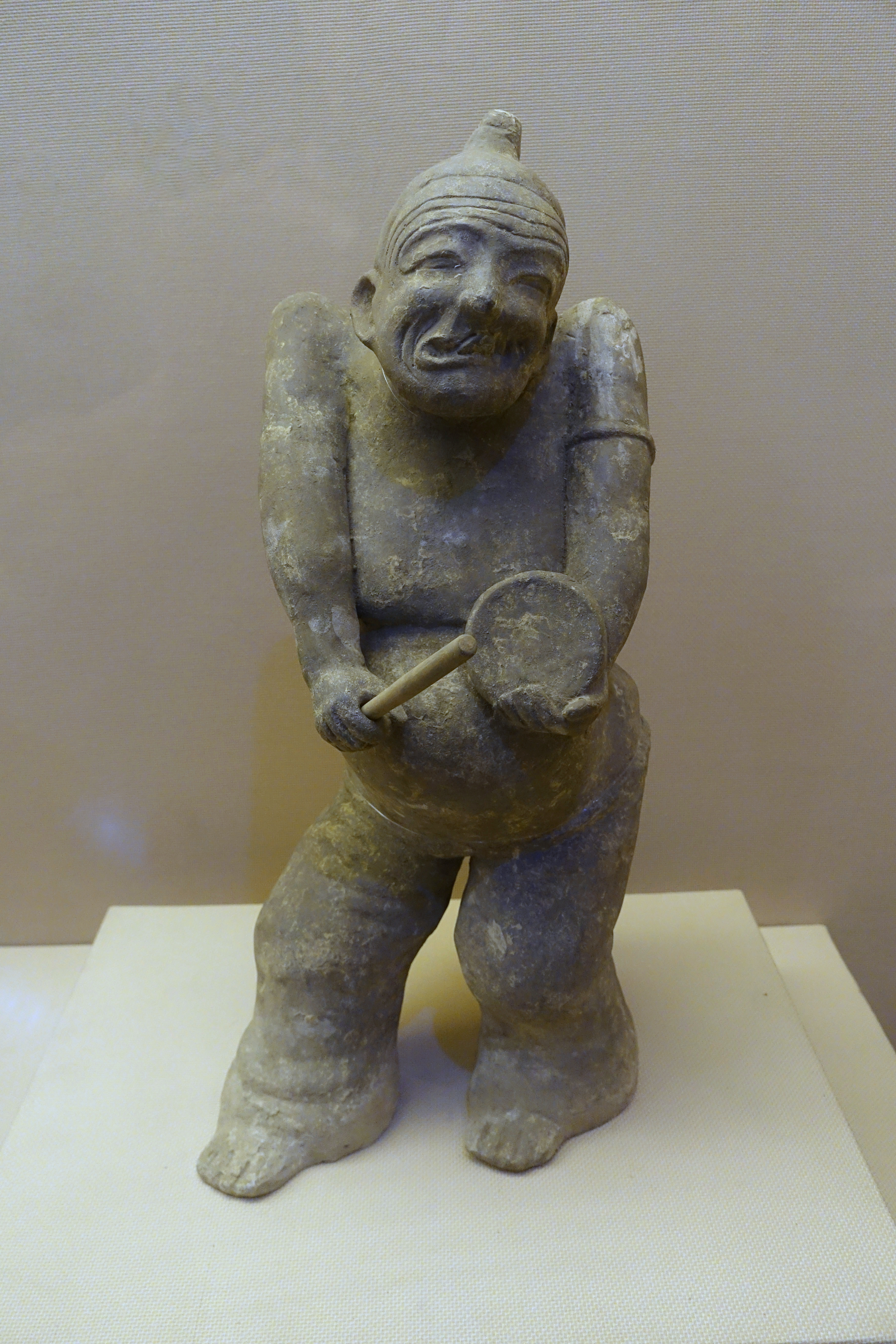
A storyteller, unearthed from a tomb of Songjialin, Pi County, Sichuan

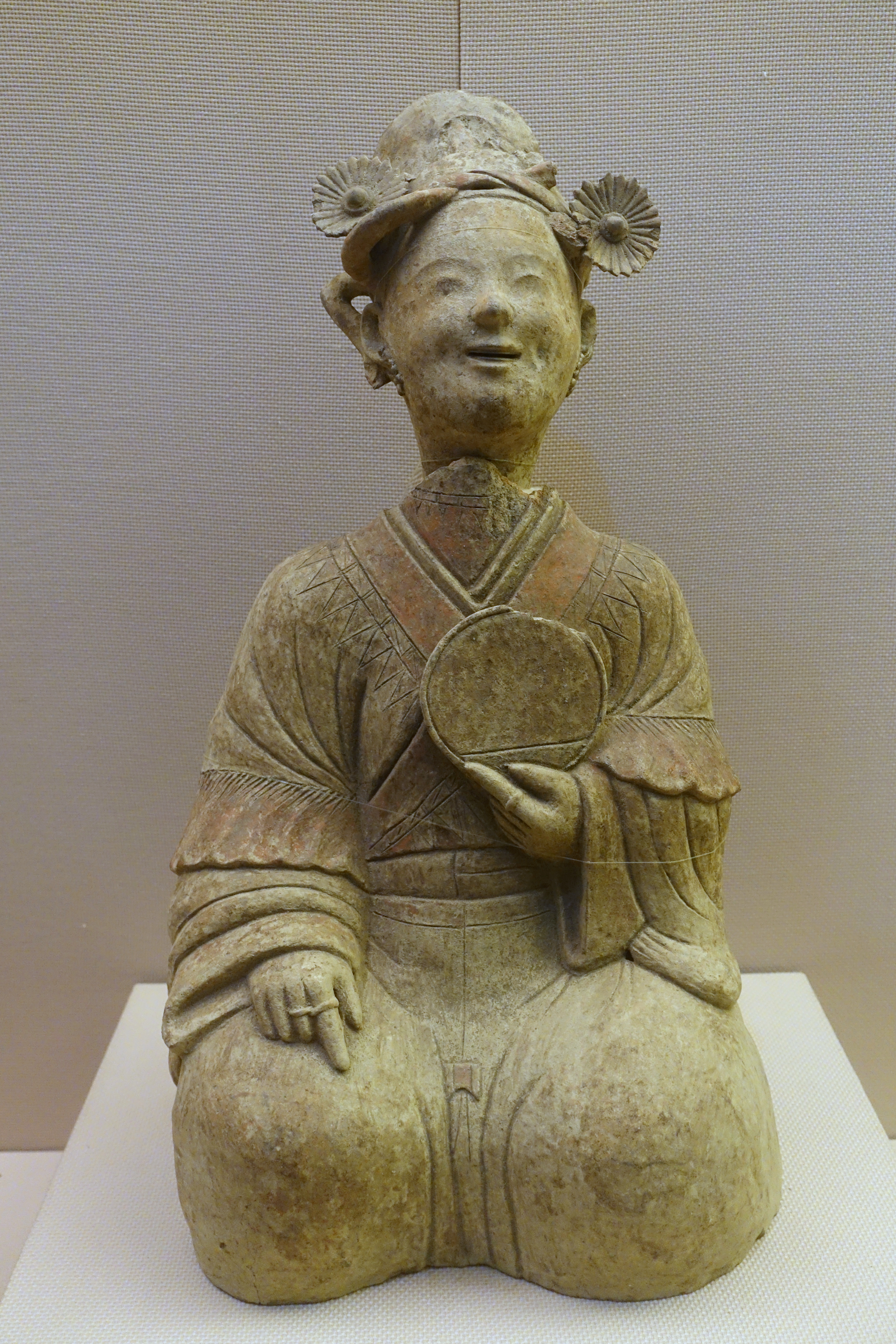
A seated woman with a bronze mirror, unearthed from a tomb of Songjialin, Pi County, Sichuan

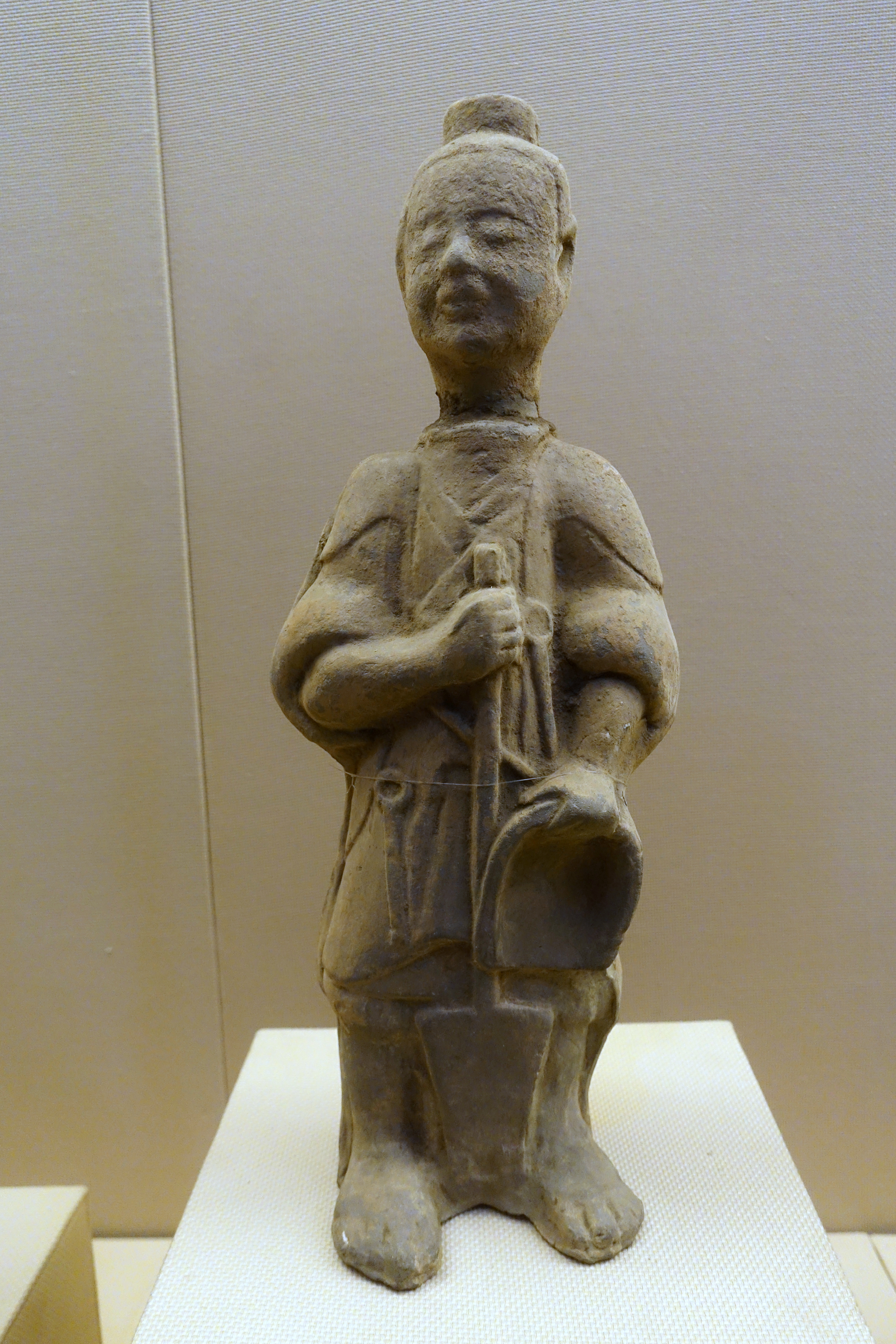
A woman with a broom and dustpan, unearthed from a tomb of Cuiping Mountain, Yibin, Sichuan

Chinese ceramic figurines of the Eastern Han (25–220 CE) period, exhibits from the Sichuan Provincial Museum, Chengdu, Sichuan, China

The Han dynasty (202 BCE – 220 CE) was a period of Imperial China divided into the Western Han (202 BCE – 9 CE) and Eastern Han (25–220 CE) periods, when the capital cities were located at Chang'an and Luoyang, respectively. It was founded by Emperor Gaozu of Han and briefly interrupted by the regime of Wang Mang (r. 9–23 CE) who usurped the throne from a child Han emperor.

The Han dynasty was an age of great economic, technological, cultural, and social progress in China. Its society was governed by an emperor who shared power with an official bureaucracy and semi-feudal nobility. Its laws, customs, literature, and education were largely guided by the philosophy and ethical system of Confucianism, yet the influence of Legalism and Daoism (from the previous Zhou dynasty) could still be seen. Members of the scholarly-gentry class who aspired to hold public office were required to receive a Confucian-based education. A new synthetic ideology of Han Confucianism was created when the scholar Dong Zhongshu (179–104 BCE) united the Confucian canon allegedly edited by Kongzi, or Confucius (551–479 BCE), with cosmological cycles of yin and yang and the Chinese five elements.

Although the social status of nobles, officials, farmers, and artisan-craftsmen was considered above the station of the lowly registered merchant, wealthy and successful businessmen acquired huge fortunes which allowed them to rival the social prestige of even the most powerful nobles and highest officials. Slaves were at the bottom of the social order, yet they represented only a tiny portion of the overall population. Retainers attached themselves to the estates of wealthy landowners, while medical physicians and state-employed religious occultists could make a decent living. People of all social classes believed in various deities, spirits, immortals, and demons. While Han Taoists were organized into small groups chiefly concerned with achieving immortality through various means, by the mid 2nd century CE they formed large hierarchical religious societies that challenged imperial authority and viewed Laozi (fl. 6th century BCE) as a holy prophet.

The typical Han-era Chinese household contained a nuclear family with an average of four to five members, unlike in later dynasties when multiple generations and extended family members commonly lived in the same household. Families were patrilineal, which made the father the supreme head of the house. Arranged marriages were the norm, while a new wife was expected to join the clan of her husband. Having sons over daughters was considered extremely important for the sake of carrying on ancestor worship. Although girls and women were expected by custom and Confucian tradition to behave passively towards their male relatives, mothers were given a familial status above that of their sons. Women also engaged in various professions in and outside of the home and were given protection under the law. The empress was superior in status to the male relatives of her consort clan, while the mother of the emperor—the empress dowager had the authority to override his decisions and choose his successor (if one had not been appointed before his death).

== Social class ==
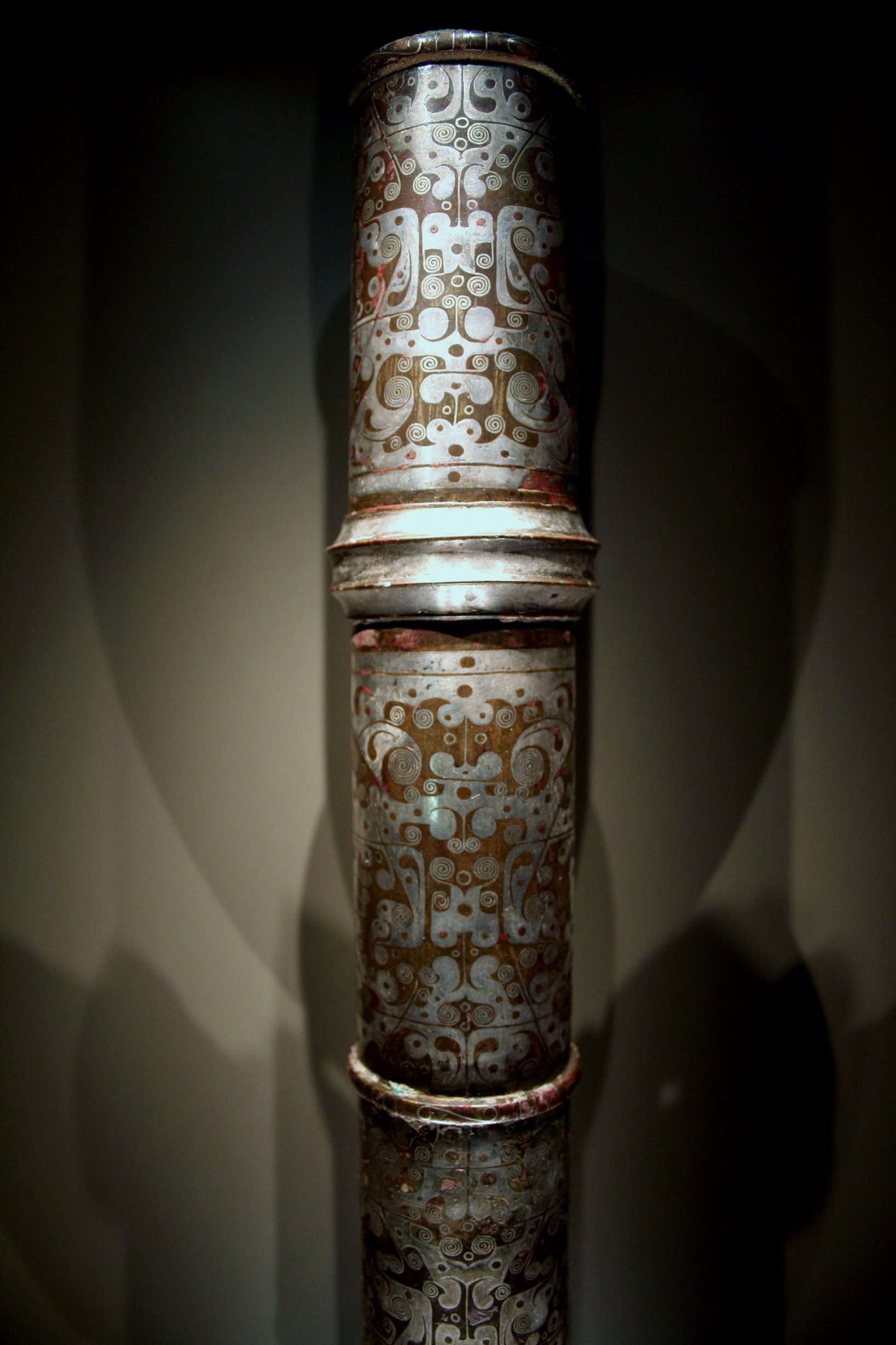
A Western-Han bronze column inlaid with silver and used to prop up a sunshade awning; aristocrats were wealthy enough to own luxury items such as this.

=== Royal family, regents, nobles, and eunuchs ===
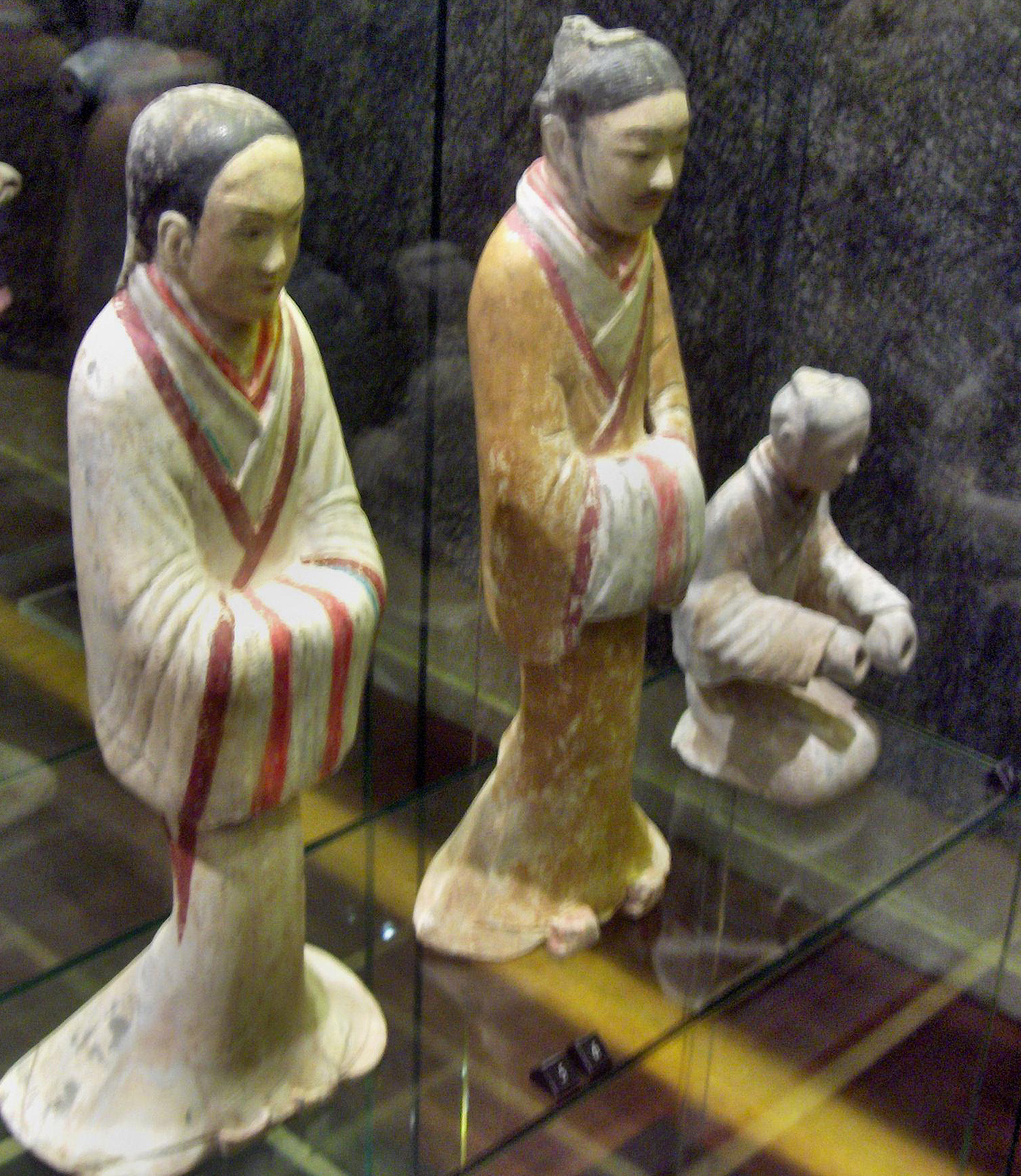
Western-Han painted pottery figurines of a female servant and male adviser from the lower or middle class; figures such as these were often placed in the tombs of nobles to serve them in the afterlife.

At the apex of Han society was the emperor, a member of the Liu family and thus a descendant of the founder Emperor Gaozu (r. 202 –195 BCE). His subjects were not allowed to address him by name; instead they used indirect references such as "under the steps to the throne" (bixia 陛下) or "superior one" (shang 上). If a commoner, government minister, or noble entered the palace without official permission, the punishment was execution. Although the Commandant of Justice—one of the central government's Nine Ministers—was in charge of meting out sentences in court cases, the emperor not only had the ability to override the Commandant's decision, but also had the sole ability to draft new laws or repeal old ones. An emperor could pardon anyone and grant general amnesties. Although the emperor often obeyed the majority consensus of his ministers in court conferences (tingyi 廷議), his approval was still needed for any state policy decision and he sometimes even rejected the majority opinion.

The emperor's most powerful relative was the empress dowager, widow to the previous emperor and usually the natural mother of the emperor. If the grandmother of an emperor—the grand empress dowager—was still alive during his reign, she enjoyed a superior position over the empress dowager. Emperors often sought the approval of the empress dowager for their decisions. If an emperor was only a child, he acted merely as a figurehead while the empress dowager dominated court politics. She not only had the right to issue edicts and pardons, but if the emperor died without a designated heir, she had the sole right to appoint a new emperor. Below the empress dowager were the empress and imperial concubines. Although she was the wife of the emperor, the empress's position at court was not secure and she could be removed by the emperor. However, the empress did enjoy the submission of concubines as her subordinates, who advocated the elevation of their sons over the empress's at their own peril. In the early Western Han, imperial relatives and some military officers who had served Emperor Gaozu were made kings who ruled over large semi-autonomous fiefs, but once the non-related kings had died off, an imperial edict outlawed all non-Liu family members from becoming kings. The emperor's brothers, paternal cousins, brother's sons, and emperor's sons—excluding the heir apparent—were made kings. The emperor's sisters and daughters were made princesses with fiefs. Although the central government eventually stripped away the political power of the kings and appointed their administrative staffs, kings still had a right to collect a portion of the taxes in their territory as personal income and enjoyed a social status that ranked just below the emperor. Each king had a son designated to be heir apparent, while his other sons and brothers were given the rank of marquess and ruled over small marquessates where a portion of the taxes went to their private purse. Although kings and marquesses enjoyed many privileges, the imperial court was at times aggressive towards them to check their power. Starting with Emperor Gaozu's reign, thousands of noble families, including those from the royal houses of Qi, Chu, Yan, Zhao, Han, and Wei from the Warring States period, were forcibly moved to the vicinity of the capital Chang'an. Very few of the descendants of Warring States nobility held prominent positions; the ranks of the nobility were filled by the families of Liu Bang's associates who were almost entirely from his home region of Pei (modern Xuzhou). In the first half of Western Han, resettlement could also be imposed on powerful and wealthy officials as well as individuals who owned property worth more than a million cash.

The position of regent (officially known as General-in-Chief 大將軍) was created during Emperor Wu's reign (r. 141–87 BCE) when he appointed three officials to form a triumvirate regency over the central government while the child Emperor Zhao (r. 87–74 BCE) sat on the throne. Regents were often relatives-in-law to the emperor through his empress's family, but they could also be men of lowly means who depended on the emperor's favor to advance their position at court. Eunuchs who maintained the harem of the palace could also gain a similar level of power. They often came from the middle class and had links to trade. In the Western Han, there are only a handful of examples where eunuchs rose to power since the official bureaucracy was strong enough to suppress them. After the eunuch Shi Xian (石顯) became the Prefect of the Palace Masters of Writing (中尚書), Emperor Yuan (r. 48–33 BCE) relinquished much of his authority to him, so that he was allowed to make vital policy decisions and was respected by officials. However, Shi Xian was expelled from office once Emperor Cheng (33–7 BCE) took the throne. No palace eunuch would obtain comparable authority again until after 92 CE, when the eunuchs led by Zheng Zhong (d. 107 CE) sided with Emperor He (r. 88–105 CE) in a coup to overthrow the Dou 竇 clan of the empress dowager. Officials complained when eunuchs like Sun Cheng (d. 132 CE) were awarded by Emperor Shun (r. 125–144 CE) with marquessates, yet after the year 135 CE the eunuchs were given legal authority to pass on fiefs to adopted sons. Although Emperor Ling (r. 168–189 CE) relinquished a great deal of authority to eunuchs Zhao Zhong (d. 189 CE) and Zhang Rang (d. 189 CE), the eunuchs were slaughtered in 189 CE when Yuan Shao (d. 202 CE) besieged and stormed the palaces of Luoyang.

=== Gentry scholars and officials ===
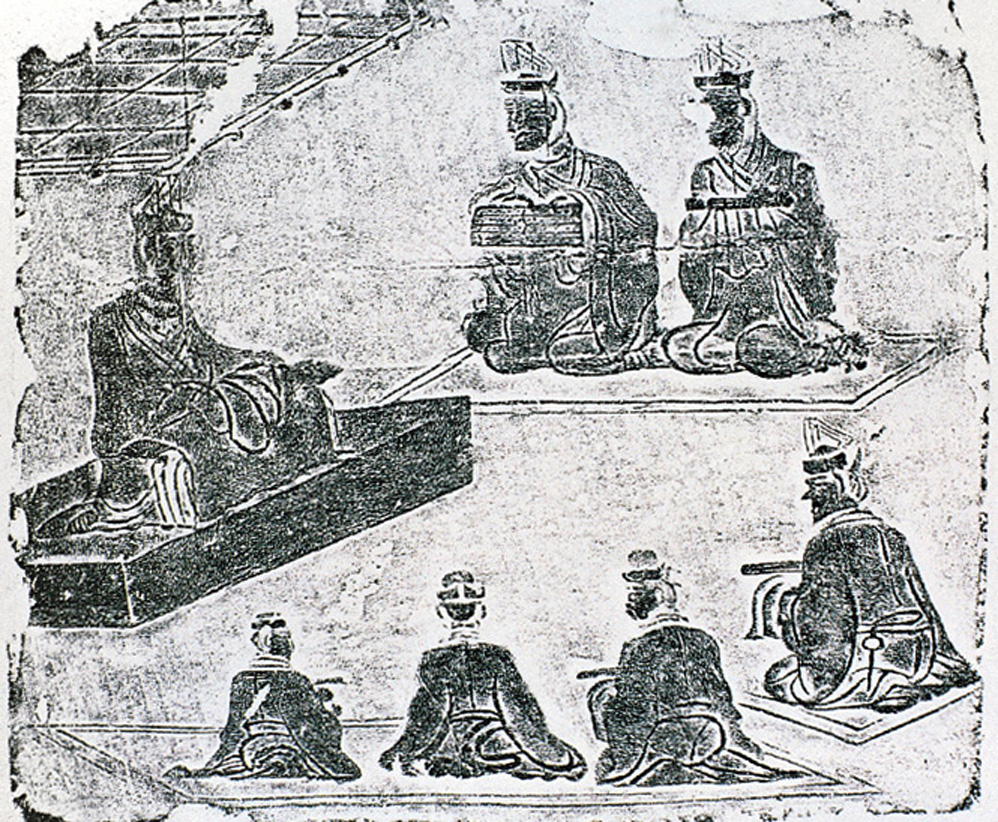
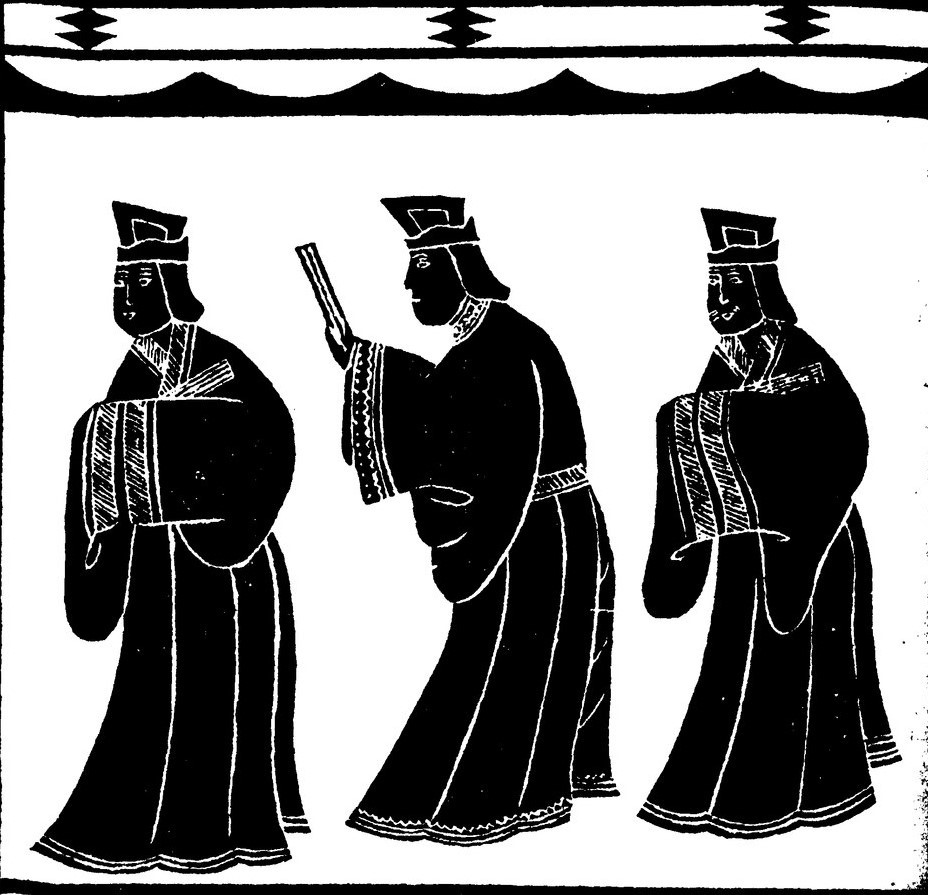
Scholars depicted on Han dynasty pictorial brick and stone-relief. Scholars and officials wore headwear called "Jinxian Guan" (进贤冠) to denominate educational status.

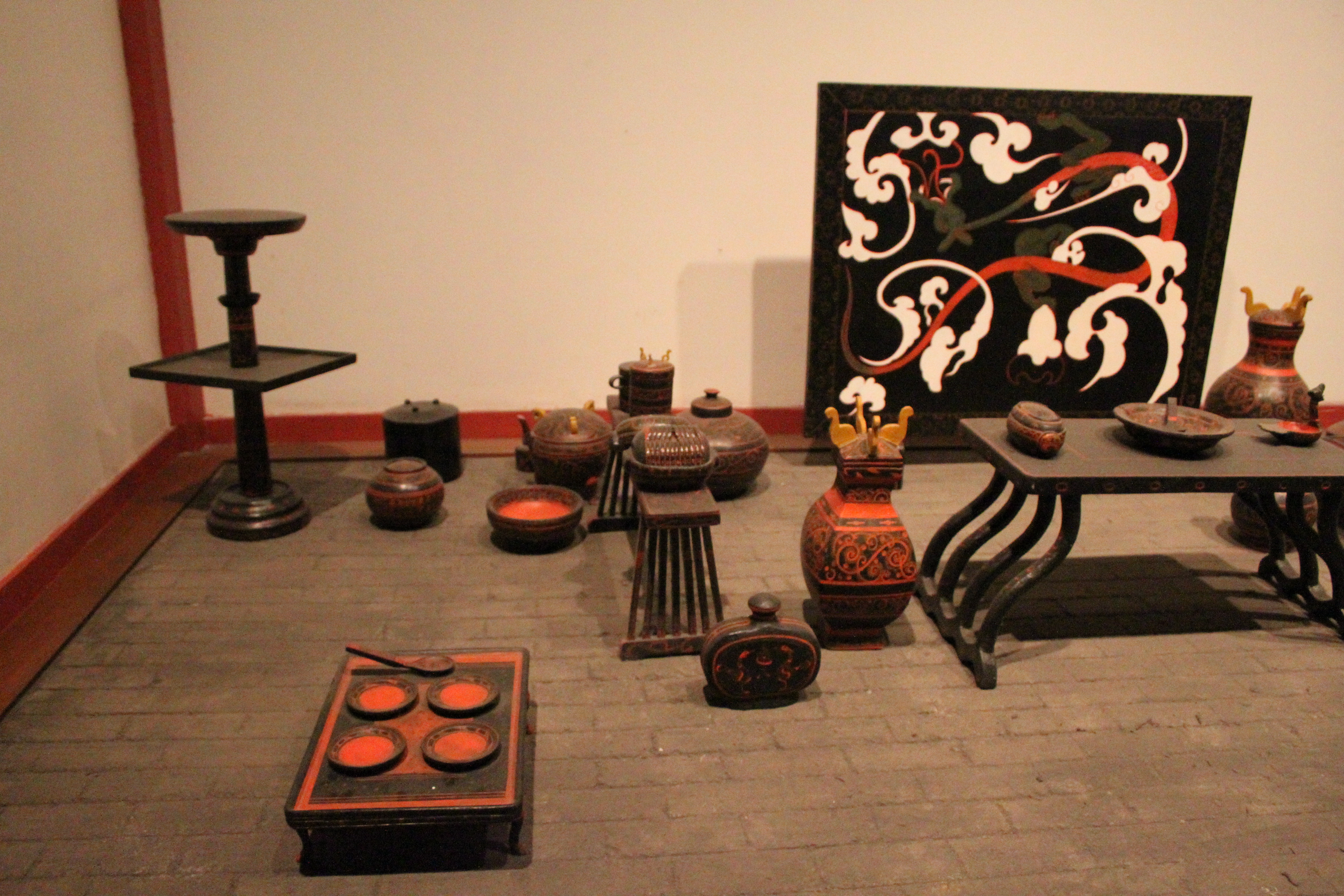
Museum restoration of a lacquered furniture and furbishing. Lacquerware became a common luxury item in the Han dynasty.

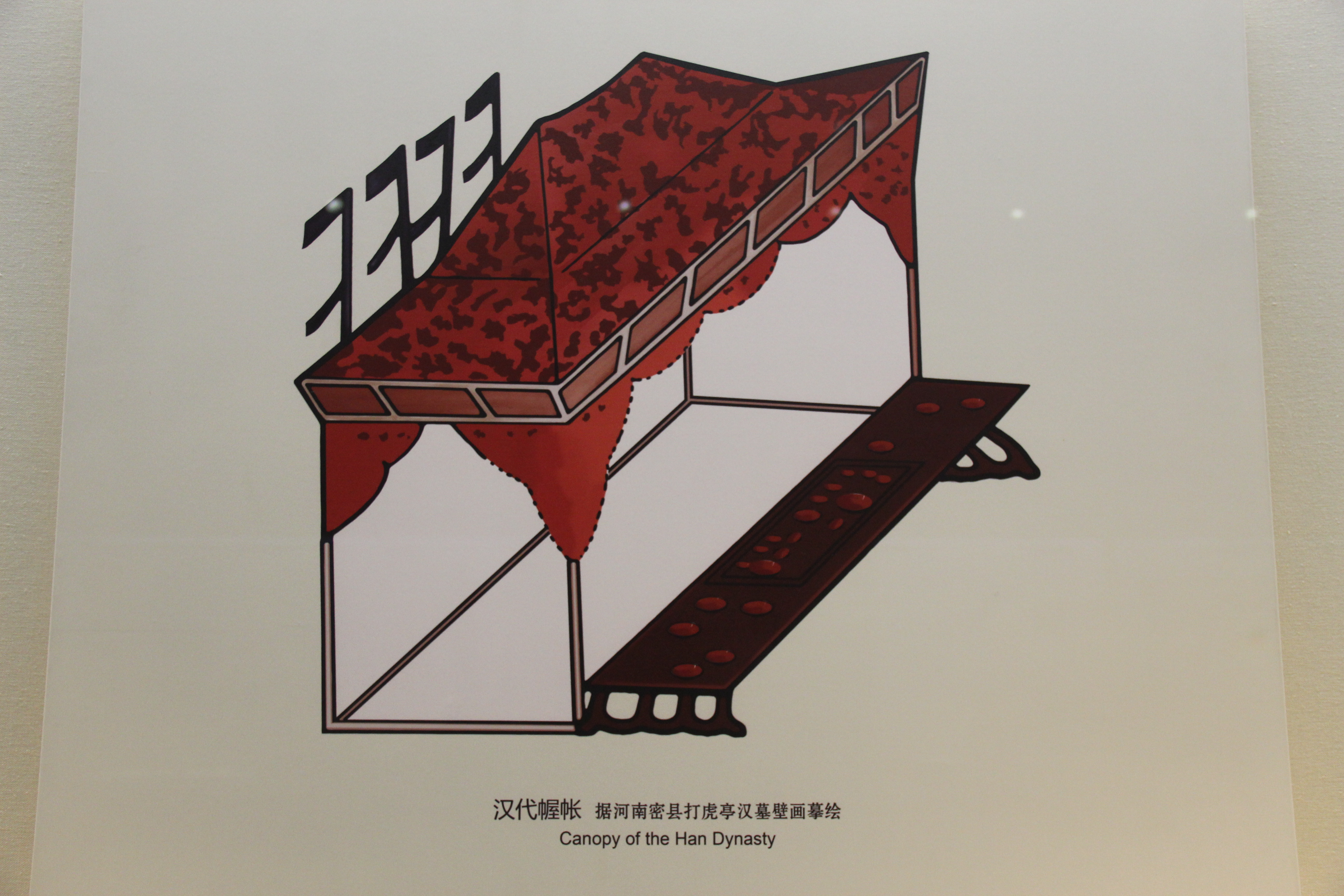
Tracing of Han dynasty canopy and table used by the gentry.

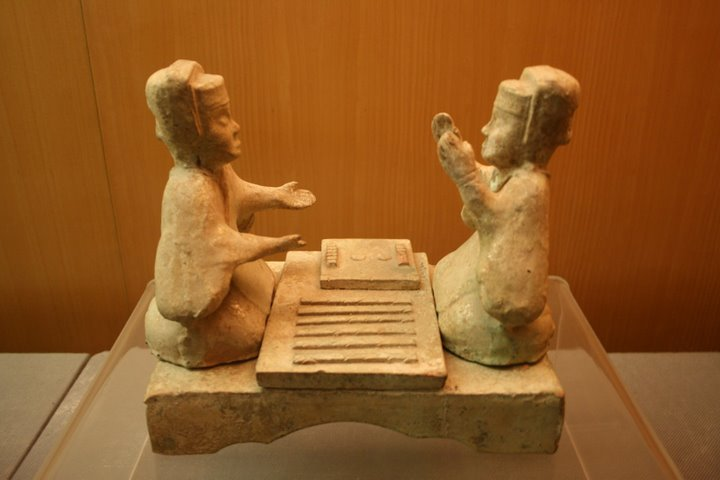
Han pottery figurines of gentrymen playing and arguing over a divinational board game of liubo, which became popular during the Han dynasty.

Those who served in government had a privileged position in Han society that was just one tier below the nobles (yet some high officials were also ennobled and had fiefs). They could not be arrested for crimes unless permission was granted by the emperor. However, when officials were arrested, they were imprisoned and fettered like commoners. Their punishments in court also had to gain the approval of the emperor. Officials were not exempt from execution, yet they were often given a chance to commit suicide as a dignified alternative. The most senior posts were the Three Excellencies—excluding the Grand Tutor, a post that was irregularly occupied. The individual titles and functions of the Three Excellencies changed from Western to Eastern Han. However, their annual salaries remained at 10,000 dan (石) of grain, largely commuted to payments in coin cash and luxury items like silk. Below them were the Nine Ministers, each of whom headed a major government bureau and earned 2,000 bushels a year. The lowest-paid government employees made Equivalent to 100 bushels annually. It was thought that wealthy officials would be less tempted by bribes. Therefore, in the beginning of the dynasty, having a total assessed taxable wealth of one hundred thousand coins was a prerequisite for holding office. This was reduced to forty thousand coins in 142 BCE, yet from Emperor Wu's reign onwards this policy was no longer enforced.

Starting in Western Han was a system of recommendation where local officials submitted proposals to the capital on which of their subordinates were worthy candidates for holding office; this created a patron-client relationship between former superiors and successful nominees to higher office. With the enhanced prestige of the consort clan under Empress Dowager Dou (d. 97 CE), a succession of regents from her clan and others amassed a large number of clients whose chances of promotion hinged on the political survival of the empress dowager's clan, which was often short-lived. Aside from patron-client relationships, one could use family connections to secure office. Patricia Ebrey writes that in the Western Han, access to public office and promotion through social mobility were open to a larger segment of the populace than in Eastern Han. A third of the two hundred and fifty-two Eastern Han government officials who had biographies in the Book of Later Han were sons or grandsons of officials, while a fifth came from prominent provincial families or had ancestors who had served as officials. For forty-six of the one hundred and ten years between 86 and 196 CE, at least one post of the Three Excellencies was occupied by a member of either the Yuan or Yang clan.

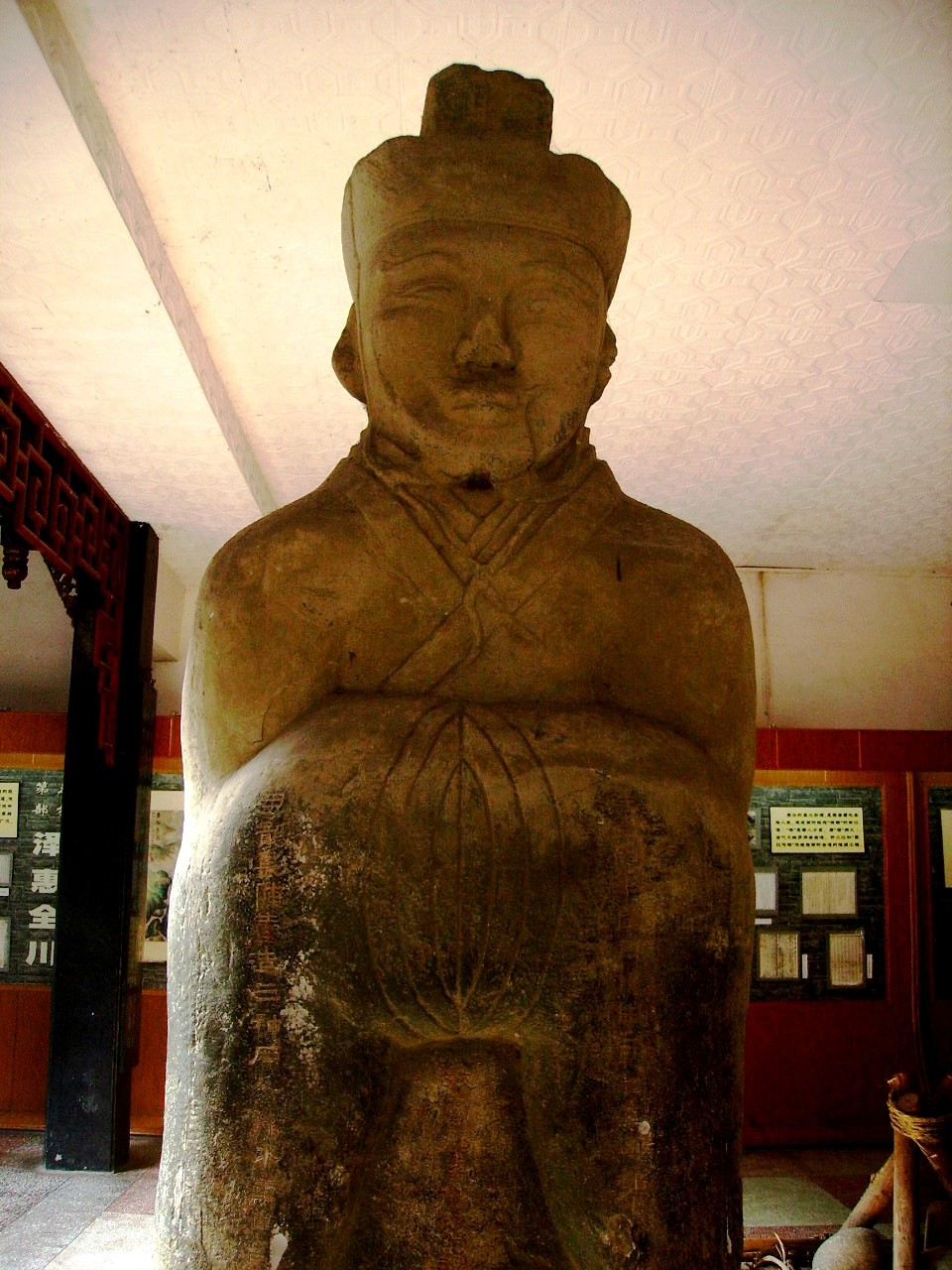
An Eastern Han devotional stone statue depicting Li Bing (fl. 3rd century BC) in an official's cap and robe in Dujiangyan, Sichuan

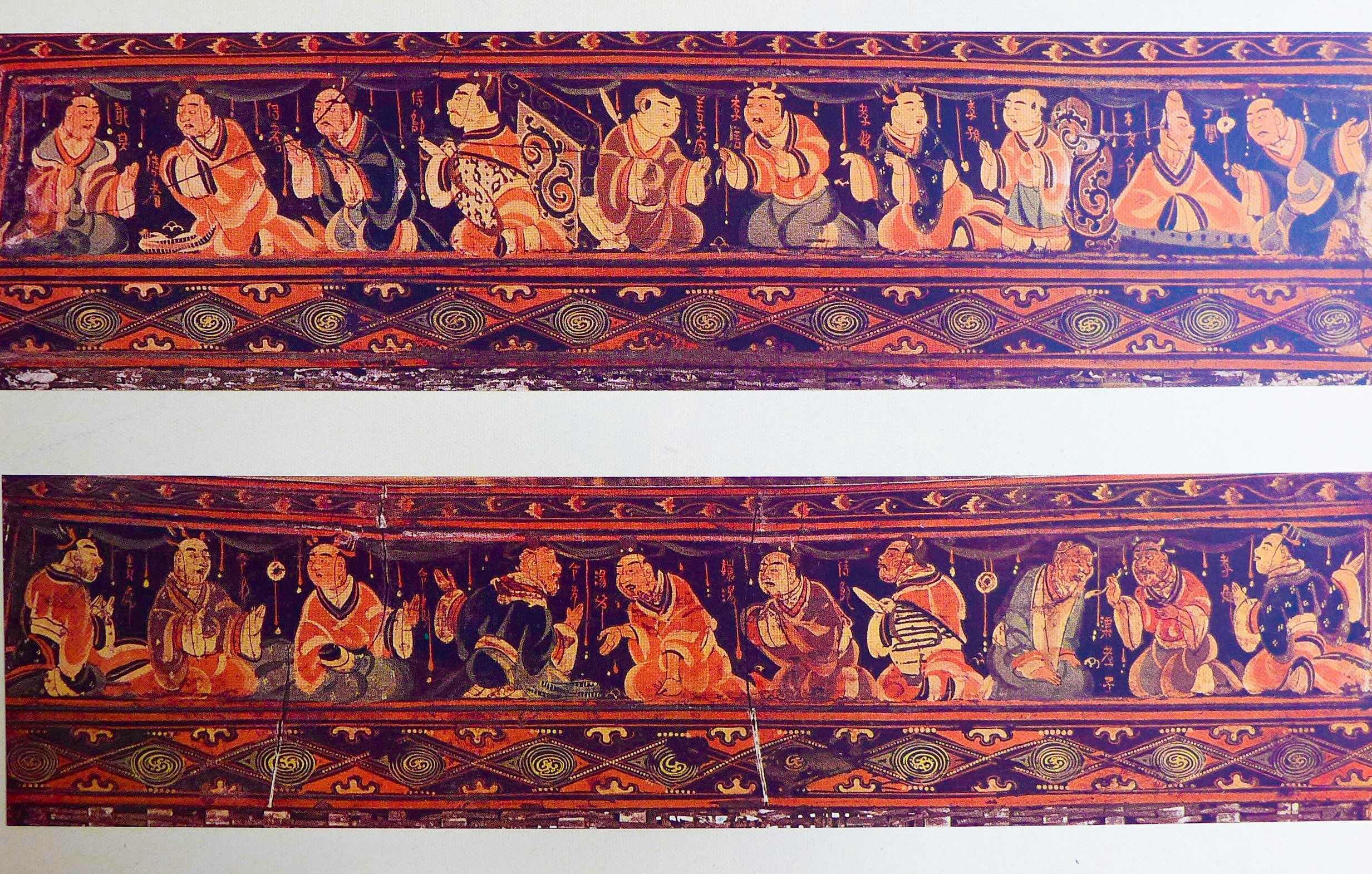
Paragons of filial piety painted on a lacquered basketwork box that was excavated from an Eastern Han tomb in what was the Chinese Lelang Commandery (in modern North Korea).

Many central government officials also began their careers as subordinate officers for commandery-level administrations. There are only rare cases (i.e. involving military merit during rebellions of late Eastern Han) when subordinate officers of county-level administrations advanced to the level of central government. Even if one secured an office by these means, an official was still expected to be competent, thus a formal education became the hallmark of those aspiring to fill public office. In addition to private tutoring, the Imperial University was established in 124 BCE which then accommodated only fifty pupils, but by the 2nd century CE the student body had reached about thirty thousand. These students could be appointed by the emperor to various government posts according to their examination grades.

Despite a decline in social mobility for those of less prominent clans, the local elites became far more integrated into a nationwide upper class social structure during the Eastern Han period, thus expanding the classification of who belonged to the upper class. The emerging gentry class—which became fully consolidated during the Eastern Han—consisted of unemployed scholars, teachers, students, and government officials. These men, although geographically separated and mired in local activities, started to view themselves as participants in wider national affairs of politics and scholarship. They recognized shared values of filial piety, deference, and emphasizing study in the Five Classics over holding public office. Emperors Yuan and Cheng were forced to abandon their resettlement schemes for officials and their families around the royal tombs settlement in 40 BCE and 15 BCE, respectively; unlike the days of Emperor Wu, historian Cho-Yun Hsu asserts that at this point officials and scholars had so much influence in both local and national-level politics that to forcibly relocate them became unthinkable.

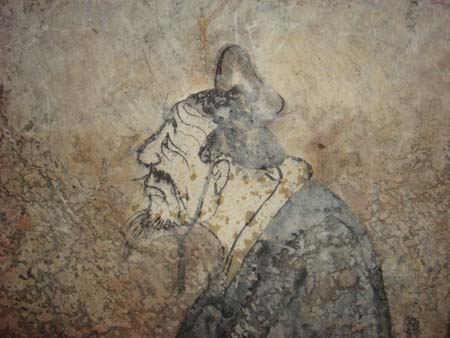
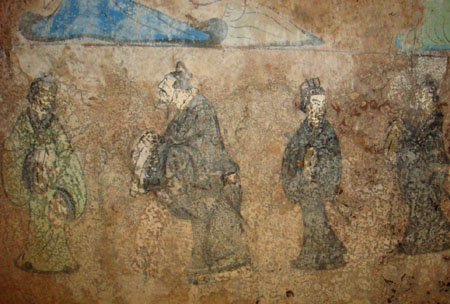
A Western Han (202 BCE – 9 CE) fresco depicting Confucius (and Laozi), from a tomb of Dongping County, Shandong province, China

In a show of solidarity against the eunuchs' interference in court politics with the coup against the regent Liang Ji (d. 159 CE), a widespread student protest broke out where Imperial University students took to the streets and chanted the names of the eunuchs they opposed. At the instigation of the eunuchs, Emperor Huan (r. 146–168 CE) initiated the Partisan Prohibitions in 166 CE, a wide-scale proscription against Li Ying (李膺) and his associates in the Imperial University and in the provinces from holding office (branded as partisans: 黨人). With the suicide of regent Dou Wu (d. 168 CE) in his confrontation with the eunuchs shortly after Emperor Ling (r. 168–189 CE) was placed on the throne, the eunuchs banned hundreds more from holding office while selling offices at the highest bidder. Repulsed by what they viewed as a corrupted government, many gentrymen considered a moral, scholarly life superior to holding office, and thus rejected nominations to serve at court. Until they were repealed in 184 CE (to garner gentry support against the Yellow Turban Rebellion), the partisant prohibitions created a large independent, disaffected portion of the gentry who did not simply return to a reclusive life in their hometowns, but maintained contacts with other gentry throughout China and actively engaged in the protest movement. Acknowledging that the gentry class was able to recruit and certify itself, the Chancellor Cao Cao (155–220 CE) established the nine-rank system where a distinguished gentry figure in each county and commandery would assign local gentlemen a rank that the government would use to evaluate nominees for office.

=== Farmers and landowners ===
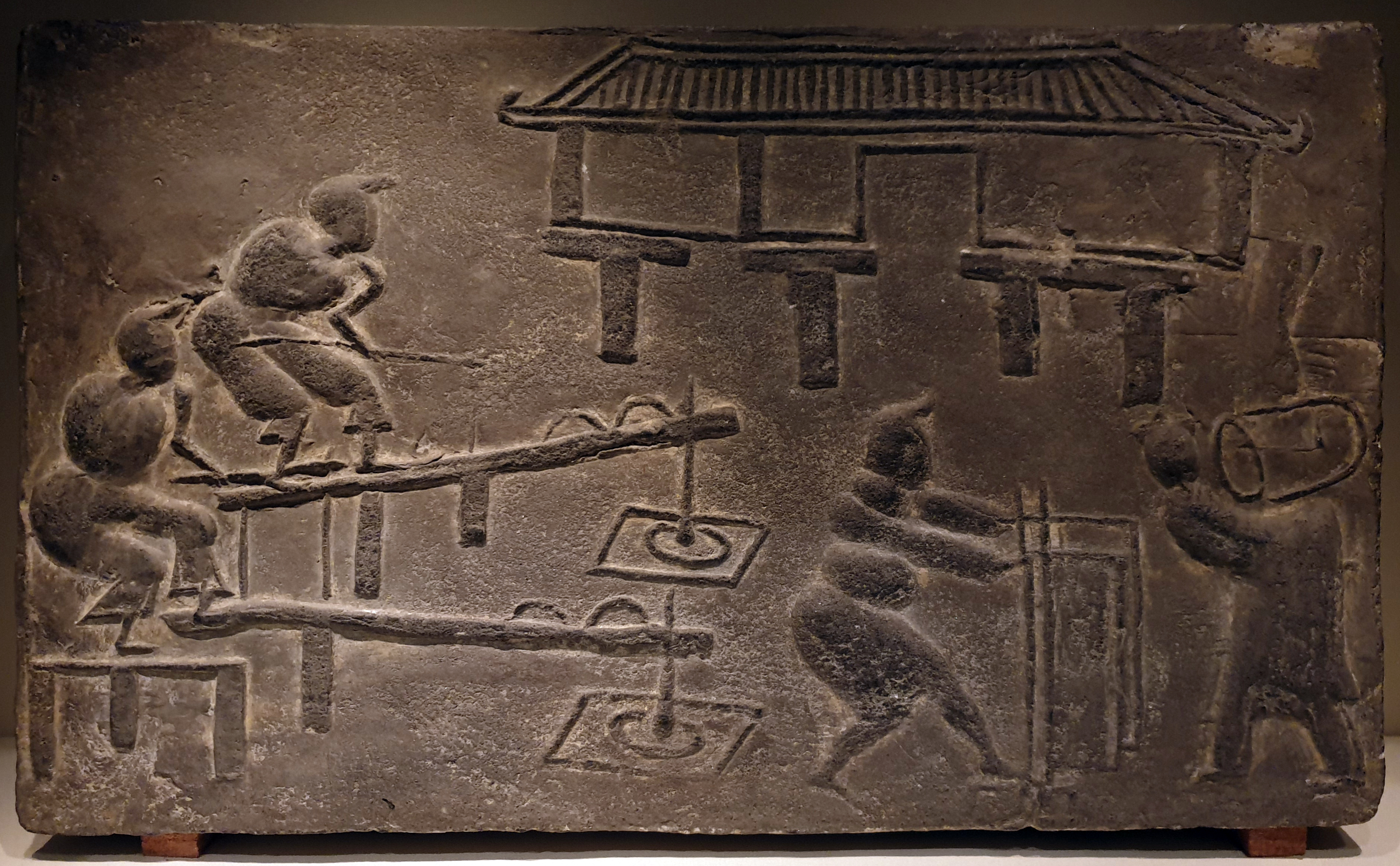
Pictorial brick scene of farmers rice-husking.

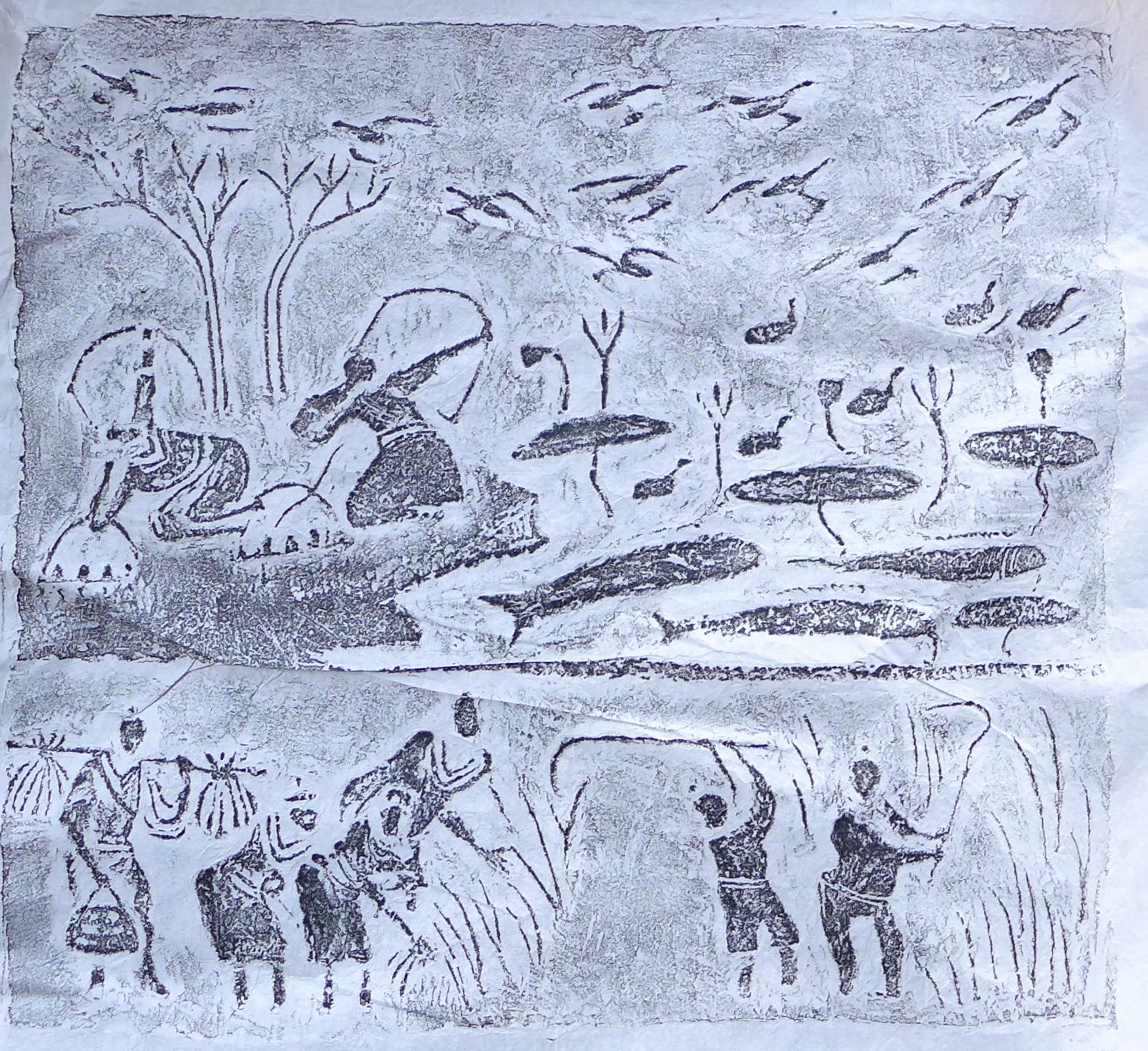
Rubbing of brick relief with Shooting and Harvesting

Many scholars who needed additional funds for education or vied for political office found farming as a decent profession which, although humble, was not looked down upon by fellow gentrymen. Wealthy nobles, officials, and merchants could own land, but they often did not cultivate it themselves and merely acted as absentee landlords while living in the city. They mostly relied on poor tenant farmers (diannong 佃農) who paid rent in the form of roughly fifty percent of their produce in exchange for land, tools, draft animals, and a small house. Wage laborers (gunong 雇農) and slaves were also employed on the estates of the wealthy, although they were not as numerous as tenants. During Western Han, the small independent owner-cultivator represented the majority of farming peasants, yet their economic struggle to remain independent during times of war, natural disaster and crisis drove many into debt, banditry, slavery, and dramatically increased the number of landless tenants by late Eastern Han. The social status of poor independent owner-cultivators was above tenants and wage laborers, yet below that of wealthy landowners. While wealthy landowners employed tenants and wage laborers, landowners who managed small to medium-sized estates often acted as managers over their sons who tilled the fields and daughters who weaved clothes and engaged in sericulture to produce silk for the home or sale at market.

During the Western Han, farming peasants formed the majority of those who were conscripted by the government to perform corvée labor or military duties. For the labor service (gengzu 更卒), males aged fifteen to fifty-six would be drafted for one month out of the year to work on construction projects and perform other duties in their commanderies and counties. For the military obligation (zhengzu 正卒), all males aged twenty-three were to train for one year in one of three branches of the military: infantry, cavalry, or navy. Until they reached age fifty-six, they were liable to perform one year of active service as troops sent to guard the frontiers from hostile nomads or to act as guards in the capital city. Significant changes were made to this system during Eastern Han; a commuting tax could be paid by peasants if they wanted to avoid the one-month labor obligation, since hired labor became more popular in construction and other projects. The military service obligation could even be avoided if a peasant paid a commuting tax, since the Eastern Han military became largely a volunteer force. Other commoners such as merchants were also able to join the army.

=== Artisans and craftsmen ===
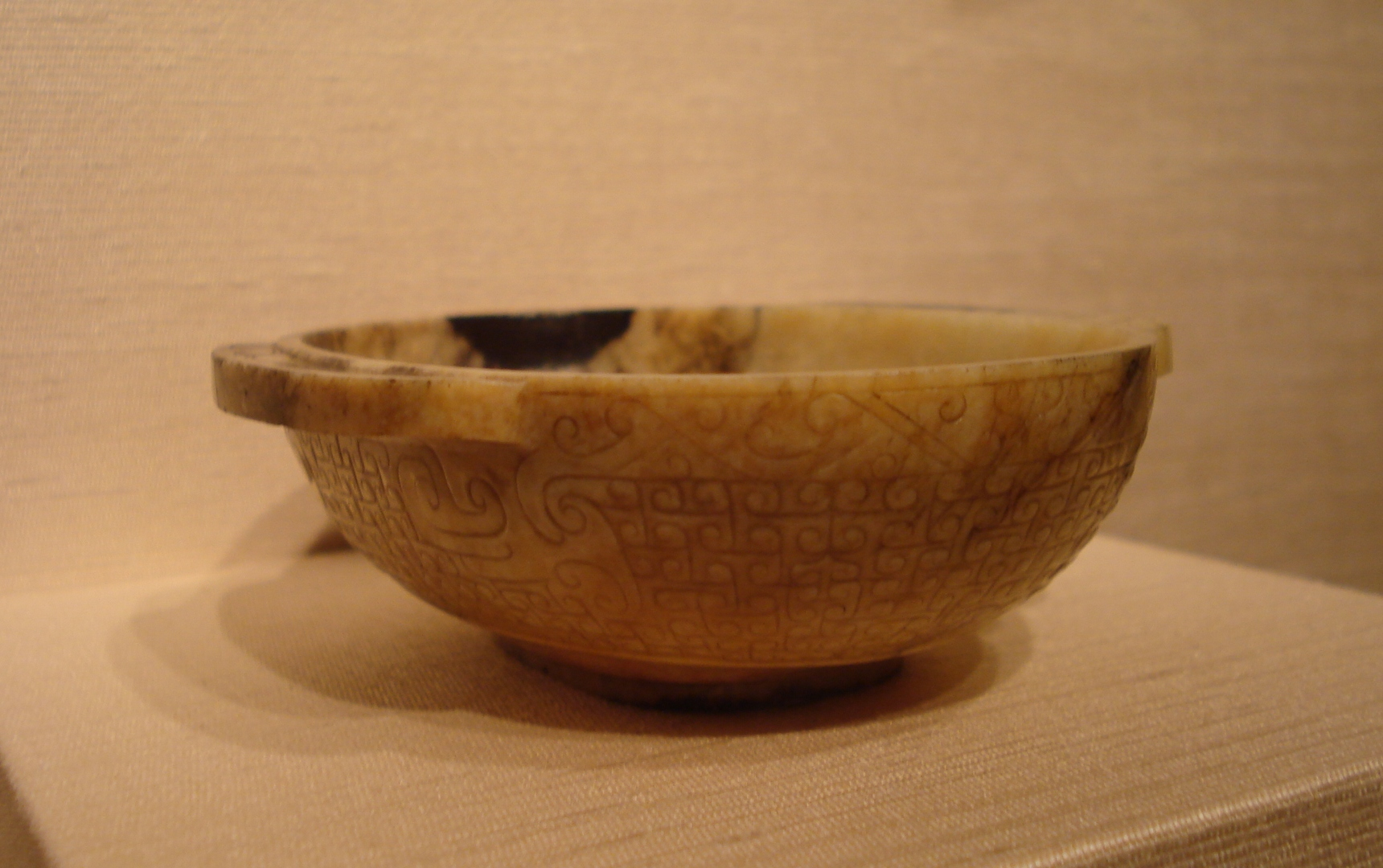
A Western-Han jade-carved wine cup; jade-carving was one of many professions that artisans engaged in.

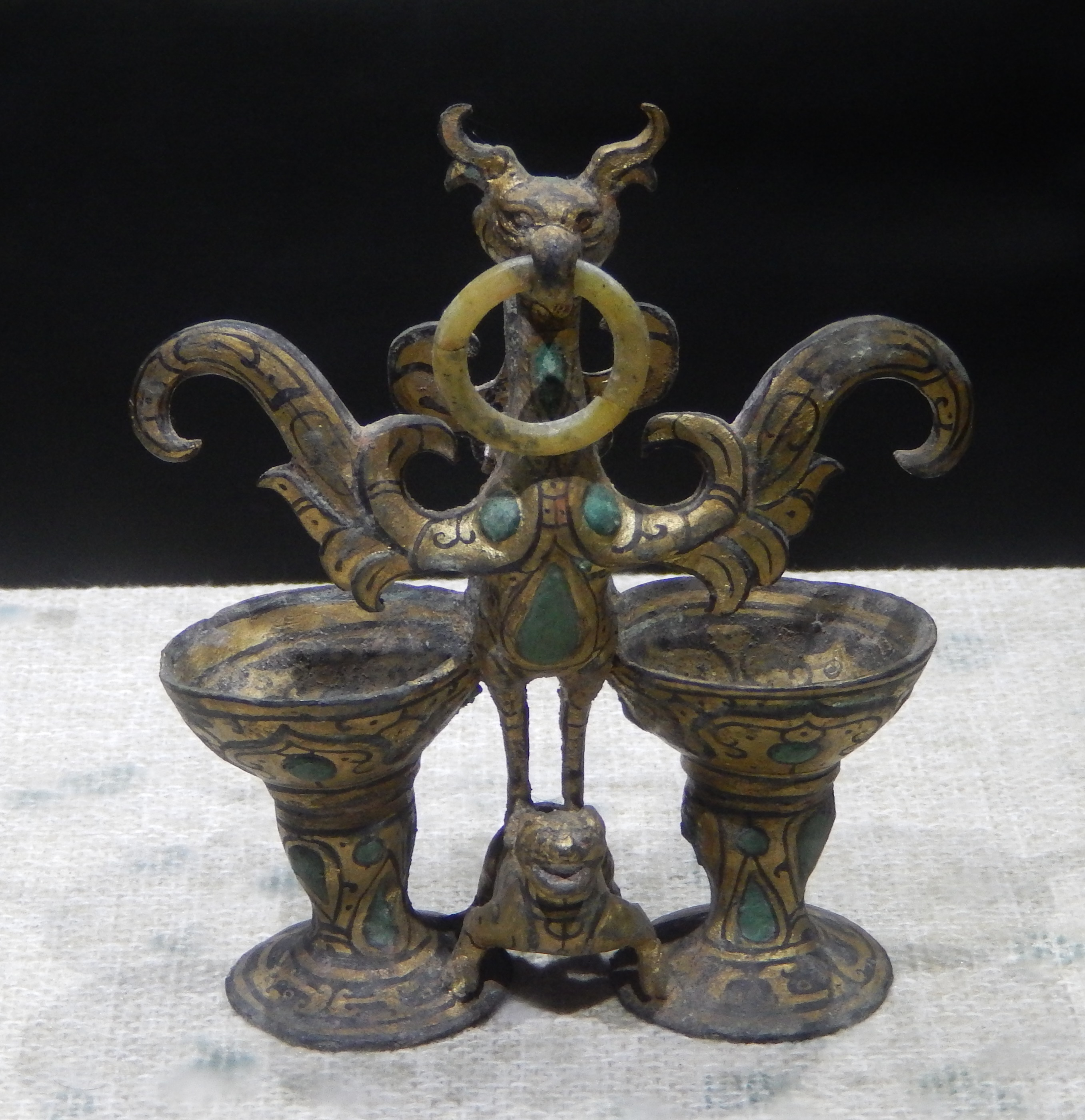
Bronze bird with jade inlays and ring in its beak and two cups, from the tomb of Dou Wan at Mancheng.

Artisans and craftsmen during the Han had a socio-economic status between that of farmers and merchants. Yet some were able to obtain a valuable income, such as one craftsman who made knives and swords and was able to eat food fit for nobles and officials. Artisans and craftsmen also enjoyed a legal status that was superior to merchants. Unlike lowly merchants, artisans were allowed by law to wear fancy silks, ride on horseback, and ride in carriages. There were also no laws which barred artisans from becoming officials. An artisan painter who worked at the Imperial Academy turned down many offers to become nominated for public office. In contrast, a bureaucrat who appointed a merchant as an official could suffer impeachment from office, while some even avoided nominations by claiming they were merchants.

Despite their legal privileges over that of merchants, the work of artisans was considered by Han Confucian scholars to be of secondary importance to that of farmers. This is perhaps largely because scholars and officials could not survive without the farmer's product and taxes paid in grain. The government relied on taxed grain to fund its military campaigns and stored surplus grain to mitigate widespread famine during times of poor harvest. Despite the prominence given to farmers, Confucian scholars did accept that artisans performed a vital economic role. This view was only rejected by a small minority of Legalists, who advocated a society of only soldiers and farmers, and certain Daoists who wanted everyone to live in self-sufficient villages and without commercial interests.

Artisans could be privately employed or they could work for the government. While government workshops employed convicts, corvée laborers, and state-owned slaves to perform menial tasks, the master craftsman was paid a significant income for his work in producing luxury items such as bronze mirrors and lacquerwares.

=== Merchants and industrialists ===
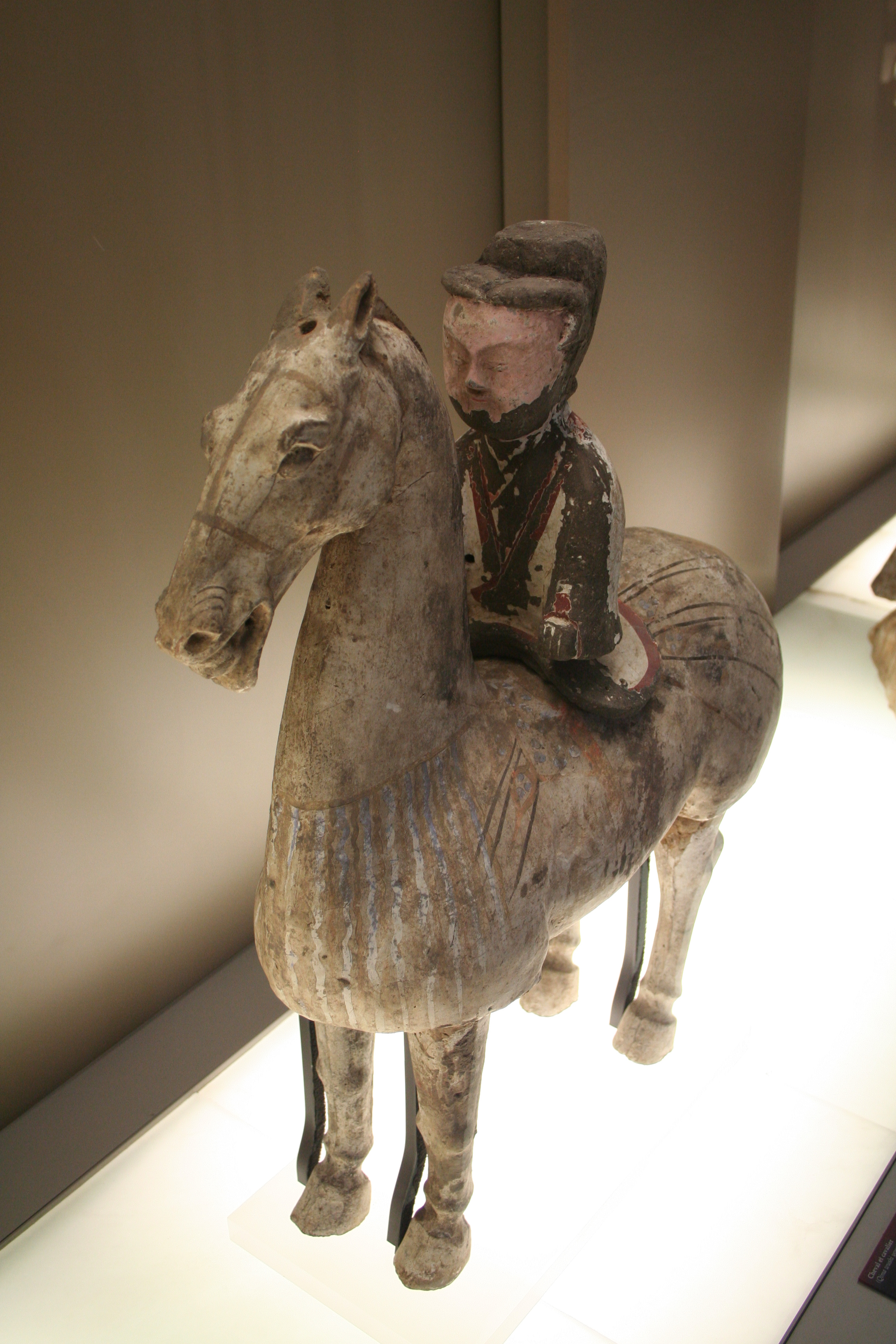
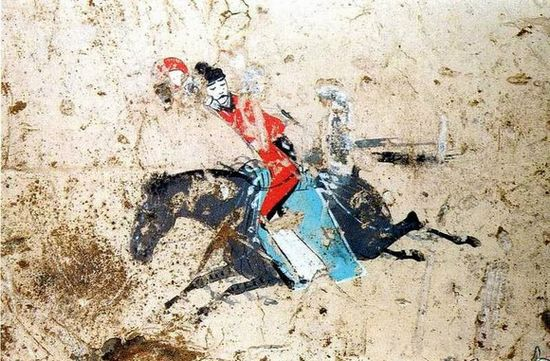
Left: a Western-Han ceramic model of a horse and rider; right: fresco of a horseman in red hunting dress from a Western-Han-dynasty tomb in Xi'an (ancient Chang'an), Shaanxi province; although registered merchants were legally barred from riding on horseback, Han writers note that such laws were largely ignored.

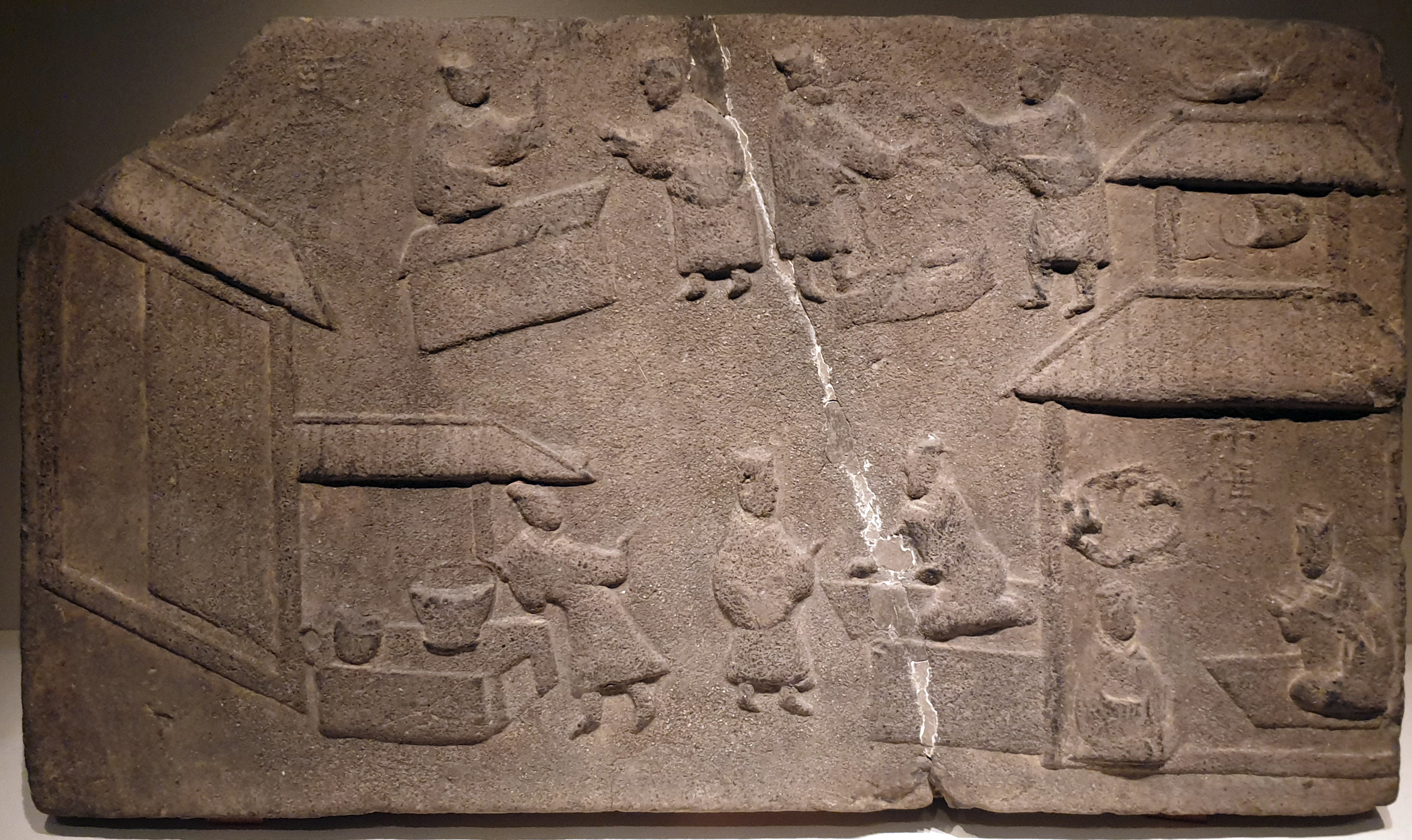
Pictorial brick relief of a market scene

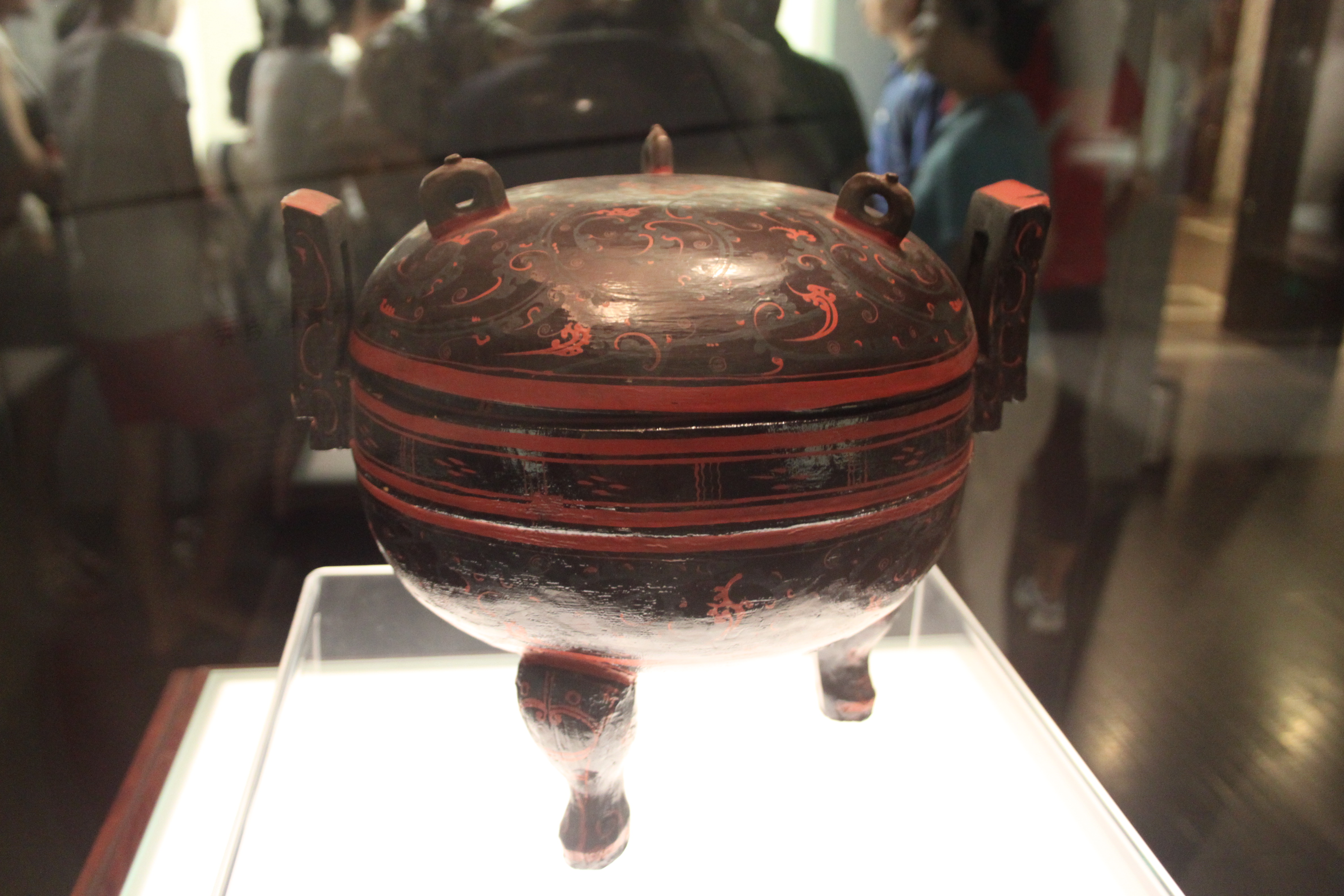
Lacquerware Ding from Mawangdui

With the exception of the bookseller and apothecary, the scholarly gentry class did not engage in trade professions, since scholars and government officials viewed the merchant class as lowly and contemptible. Sympathetic to the plight of farming peasants who had lost their land, a court edict of 94 CE stipulated that farming peasants who had been reduced to selling wares as street peddlers were not to be taxed as registered merchants, since the latter were heavily taxed by the state. Registered merchants, the majority being small urban shopkeepers, were obligated to pay commercial taxes in addition to the poll tax.

Registered merchants were forced by law to wear white-colored clothes, an indication of their low status, and could be singled out for conscription into the armed forces and forced to resettle in lands to the deep south where malaria was known to be prevalent. In contrast, itinerant merchants were often richer due to their trade between a network of towns and cities and their ability to avoid registering as merchants. Starting with Emperor Gaozu's reign, registered merchants were banned from wearing silk clothes, riding on horseback, or holding public office. This is in stark contrast to unregistered itinerant merchants who Chao Cuo (d. 154 BCE) states wore fine silks, rode in carriages pulled by fat horses, and whose wealth allowed them to associate with government officials.

Although these laws were relaxed over time, Emperor Wu renewed the state's persecution of merchants when in 119 BCE he made it illegal for registered merchants to purchase land. If they violated this law, their land and slaves would be confiscated by the state. The effectiveness of this law is questionable, since contemporary Han writers mention merchants owning huge tracts of land. A merchant who owned property worth a thousand catties of gold—equivalent to ten million cash coins—was considered a great merchant. Such a fortune was one hundred times larger than the average income of a middle class landowner-cultivator and dwarfed the annual 200,000 cash-coin income of a marquess who collected taxes from a thousand households. Some merchant families made fortunes worth over a hundred million cash, which was equivalent to the wealth acquired by the highest officials in government.

Merchants engaged in a multitude of private trades and industries. A single merchant often combined several trades to make greater profits, such as animal breeding, farming, manufacturing, trade, and money-lending. Some of the most profitable commodities sold during the Han were salt and iron, since a wealthy salt or iron distributor could own properties worth as much as ten million cash. In the early Western Han period, powerful merchants could muster a workforce of over a thousand peasants to work in salt mines and marshes to evaporate brine to make salt, or at ironworks sites where they operated bellows and cast iron implements. To curb the influence of such wealthy industrialists, Emperor Wu nationalized these industries by 117 BCE and for the first time drafted former merchants with technical know-how such as Sang Hongyang (d. 80 BCE) to head these government monopolies. However, by the Eastern Han period the central government abolished the state monopolies on salt and iron. Even before this, the state must have halted its employment of former merchants in the government salt and iron agencies, since an edict of 7 BCE restated the ban on merchants entering the bureaucracy. However, the usurper Wang Mang (r. 9–23 CE) did employ some merchants as low-level officials with a salary-rank of 600 bushels. Another profitable industry was brewing wine and liquor, which the state briefly monopolized from 98 to 81 BCE, yet relinquished its production to private merchants once again (with alcohol taxes reinstalled). The official Cui Shi (催寔) (d. 170 CE) started a brewery business to help pay for his father's costly funeral, an act which was heavily criticized by his fellow gentrymen who considered this sideline occupation a shameful one for any scholar. Cinnabar mining was also a very lucrative industry.

=== Guests and retainers ===
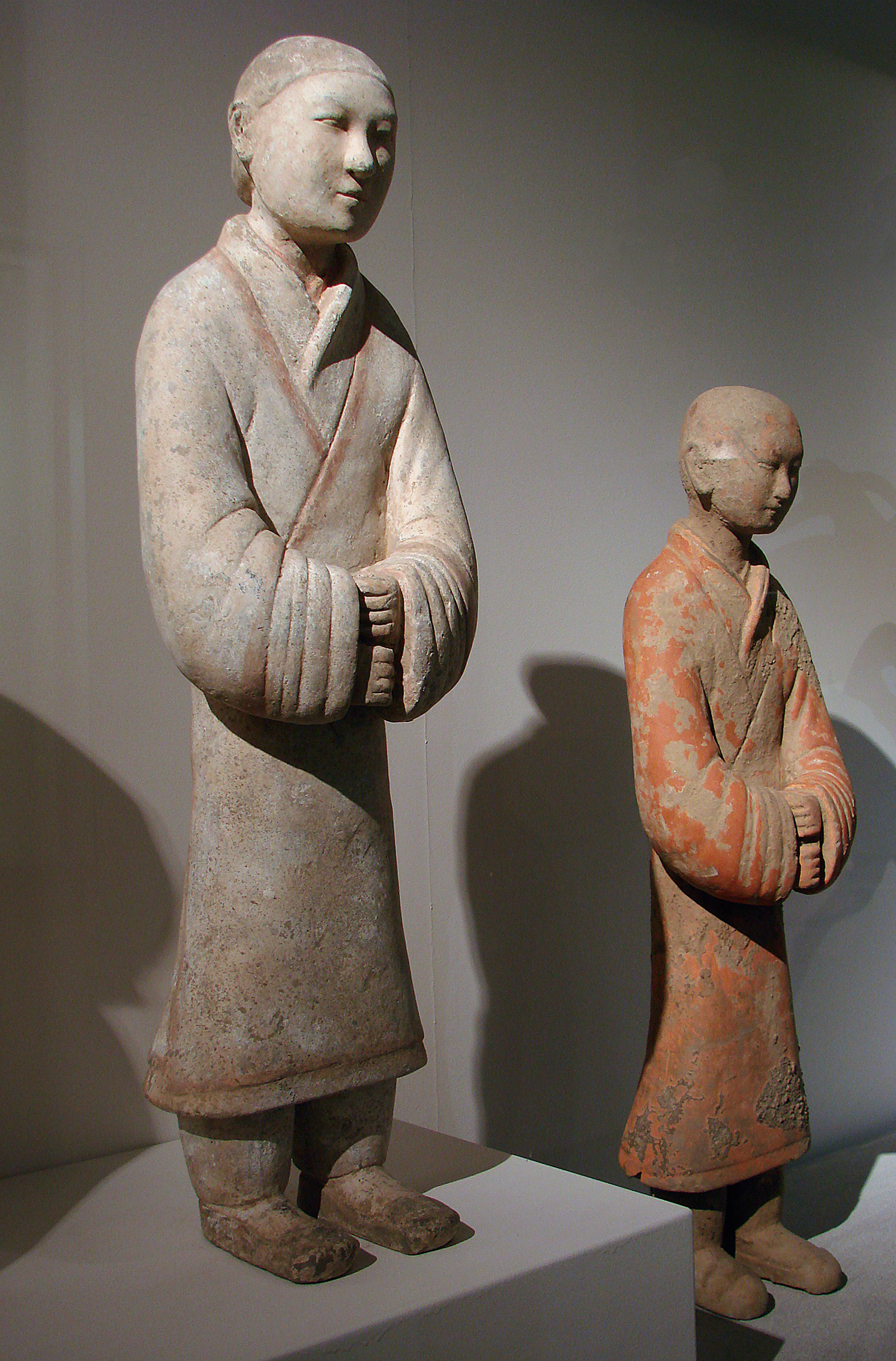
Western-Han painted ceramic figurines (with polychrome) of servants in attendance, from Shaanxi, 2nd century BCE

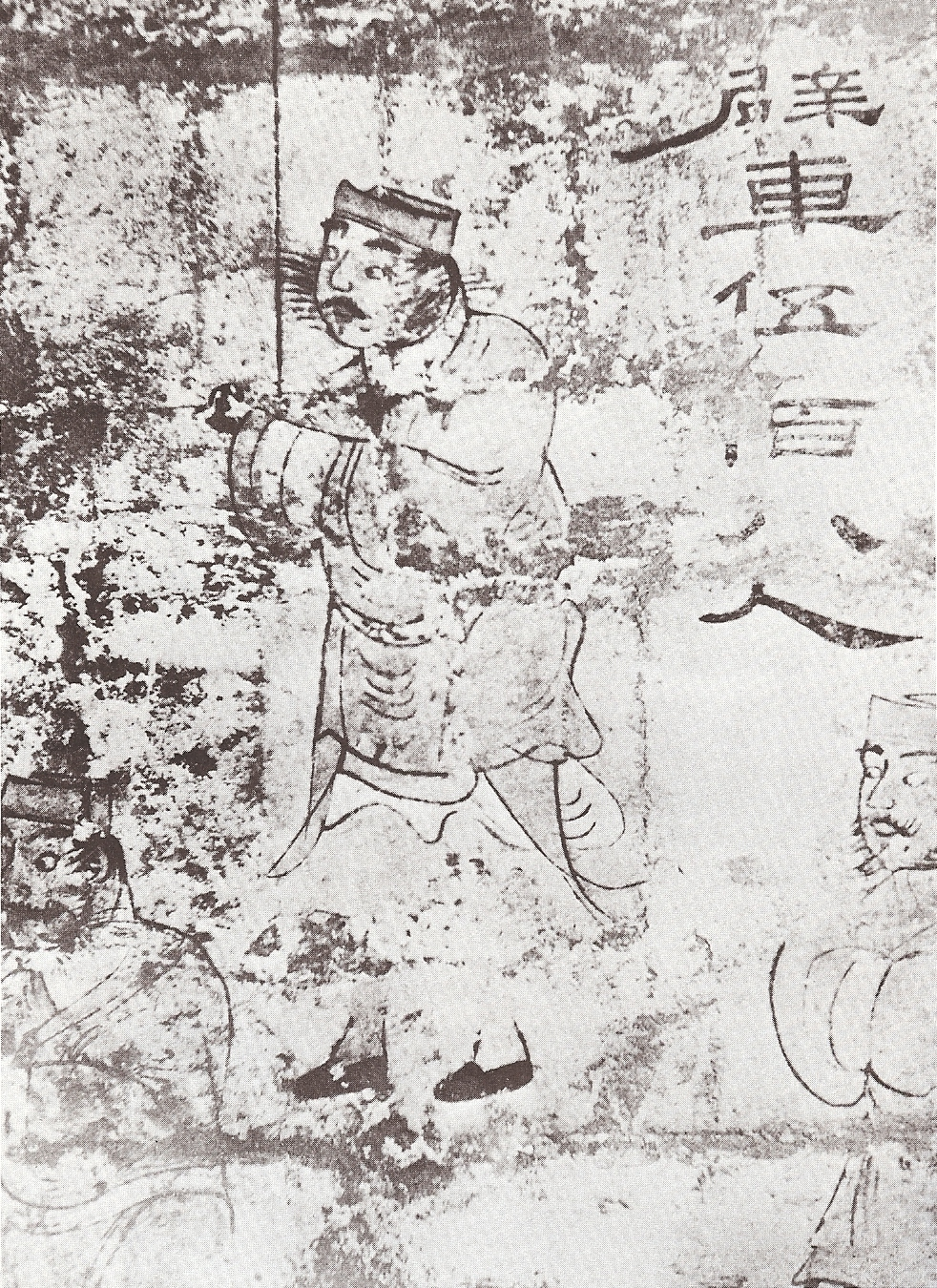
A painted mural of servants and other subordinates in silk robes, from a Han dynasty tomb at Wangdu, Hebei province.

Commoners known as guests and retainers (binke 賓客) who lived on the property of a host in exchange for services had existed since the Warring States period. Retainers often originally belonged to other social groups, and sometimes they were fugitives seeking shelter from authorities. Hosts were often wealthy nobles and officials, yet they were sometimes wealthy commoners. In a typical relationship, a host provided lodging, food, clothing, and carriage transport for his retainers in return for occasional and non-routine work or services such as an advisory role, a post as bodyguard, menial physical labor around the house, and sometimes more dangerous missions such as committing assassinations, fighting off roving bandits, or riding into battle to defend the host. Others could work as spies, scholarly protégés, or astrologers.

A host treated his retainers very well and showered them with luxury gifts if he wanted to boast his wealth and status. One retainer even received a sword scabbard decorated with jade and pearls, while others were given items like shoes decorated with pearls. However, not all retainers shared the same status, as those showered with gifts often provided highly skilled work or greater services; retainers who were not as skilled were given lesser gifts and seated in less honorable positions when meeting the host. Regardless of status, any retainer was allowed to come and go from his host's residence as he or she pleased, unlike a slave who was the property of his master and permanently attached to the estate. There was no official government policy on how to deal with retainers, but when they broke laws they were arrested, and when their master broke the law, sometimes the retainers were detained alongside him.

Retainers formed a large portion of the fighting forces amassed by the future Emperor Guangwu (r. 25–57 CE) during the civil war against Wang Mang's failing regime. The military role of retainers became much more pronounced by the late 2nd century CE during the political turmoil that would eventually split the empire into three competing states. By then, hosts began to treat retainers as their personal troops (buqu 部曲), which undercut the freedoms of mobility and independence that earlier retainers had enjoyed. Whereas individual retainers had earlier joined a host by their own personal decision, by the late 2nd century CE the lives of the retainers' entire families became heavily controlled by the host.

=== Slaves ===
Slaves (nuli 奴隸) comprised roughly 1% of the population, a proportion far less than the contemporary Greco-Roman world which relied on the labor of a large slave population. Slaves were classified into two categories: those who were privately owned, and those who were owned by the state. Privately owned slaves were often former peasants who fell into debt and sold themselves into slavery, while others were former government slaves bestowed to nobles and high officials as rewards for their services. State-owned slaves were sometimes prisoners of war (yet not all were made slaves). However, most slaves were tributary gifts given to the court by foreign states, families of criminals who committed treason against the state, and former private slaves who were either donated to authorities (since this would exempt the former slaveholder from labor obligations) or confiscated by the state if their master had broken a law. In both Western and Eastern Han, arrested criminals became convicts and it was only during the reign of Wang Mang that counterfeiting criminals were made into slaves.

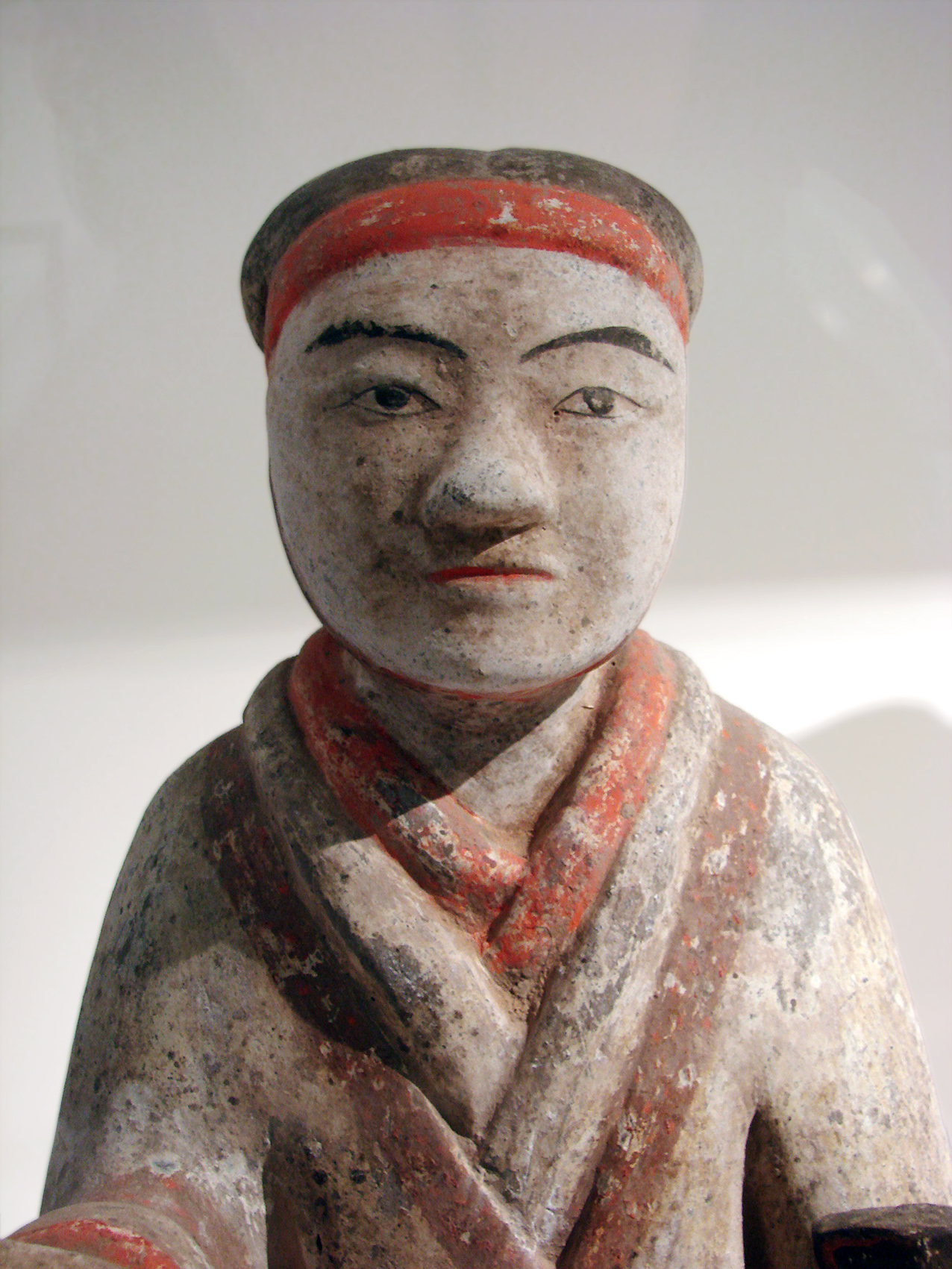
A Han pottery figurine of a soldier, dated 2nd century BCE; slaves were expected to defend their masters and sometimes rode into battle alongside them during times of war.

State-owned slaves were put to work in palaces, offices, workshops, stables, and sometimes state-owned agricultural fields, while privately owned slaves were employed in domestic services and sometimes farming. However, the vast majority of non-independent farmers working for wealthy landowners were not hired laborers or slaves, but were landless peasants who paid rent as tenants. It might have been more economically feasible to maintain tenants instead of slaves, since slave masters were obligated to pay an annual poll tax of 240 coins for each slave they owned (the same rate merchants had to pay for their poll tax). Government slaves were not assigned to work in the government's monopolized industries over iron and salt (which lasted from Emperor Wu's reign until the beginning of Eastern Han). Privately owned slaves were usually assigned to kitchen duty while others fulfilled roles as armed bodyguards, mounted escorts, acrobats, jugglers, dancers, singers, and musicians.

The children of both government and private slaves were born slaves. Government slaves could be granted freedom by the emperor if they were deemed too elderly, if the emperor pitied them, or if they committed a meritous act worthy of a manumission. In one exceptional case, the former slave Jin Midi (d. 86 BCE) became one of the regents over the government. Private slaves could buy their freedom from their master, while some masters chose to free their slaves. Although slaves were subject to beatings if they did not obey their masters, it was against the law to murder a slave; kings were stripped of their kingdoms after it was found that they had murdered slaves, while Wang Mang even forced one of his sons to commit suicide for murdering a slave. An edict of 35 CE repealed the death penalty for any slave who killed a commoner.

Not all slaves had the same social status. Some slaves of wealthy families lived better than commoners since they were allowed to wear luxurious clothes and consume quality food and wine. Slaves of high officials could even be feared and respected. The slaves of regent Huo Guang (d. 68 BCE) sometimes came armed to the marketplace and fought commoners, forced the Imperial Secretary to kowtow and apologize (after a scuffle with his slaves over the right-of-way on the street), and were provided services by some officials who sought a promotion through Huo Guang's influence.

=== Other occupations ===
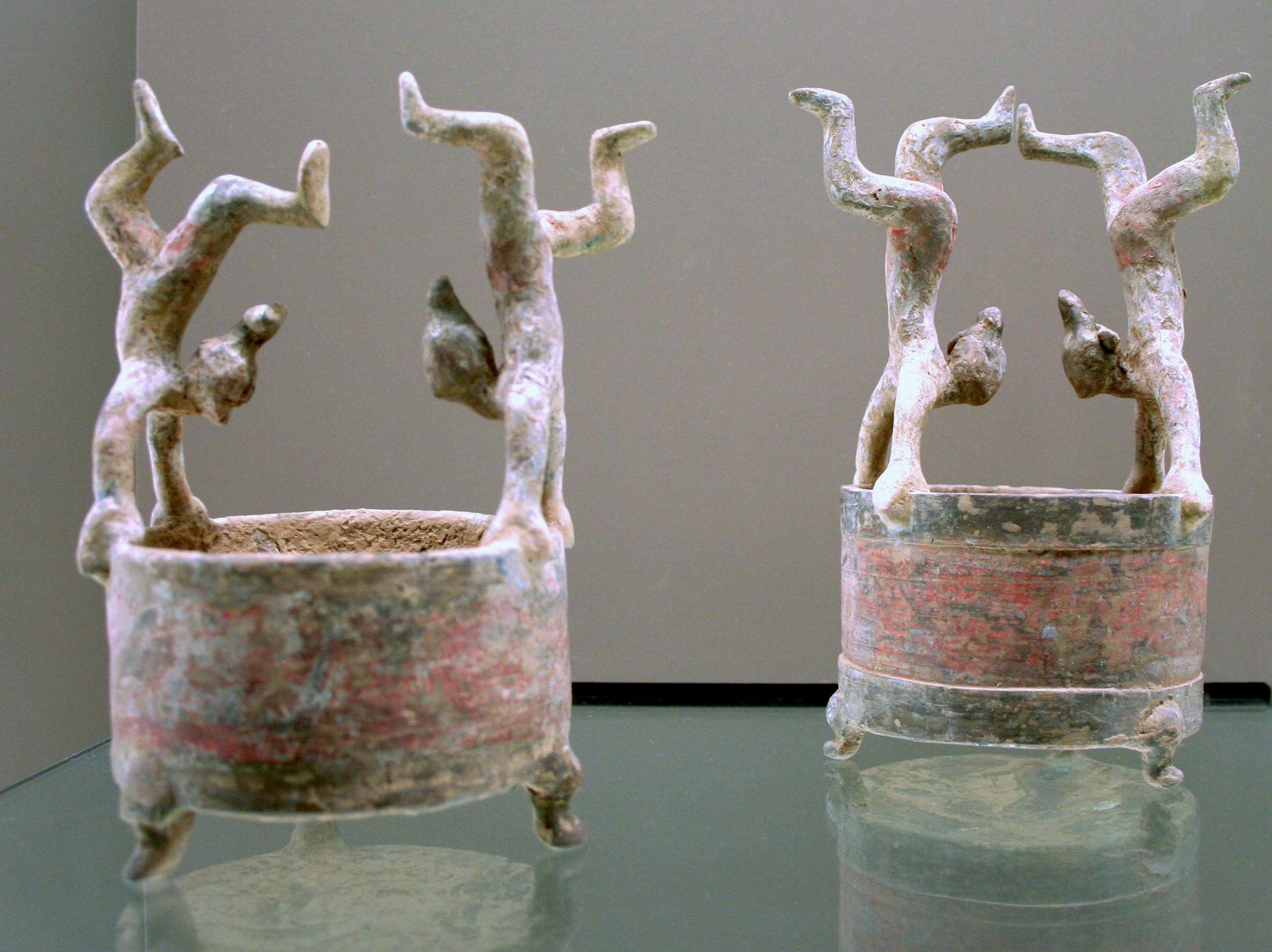
Western-Han ceramic vessels showing acrobats balancing by hand on their rims; the professional entertainer was one of many occupations during Han.

In addition to officials, teachers, merchants, farmers, artisans, and retainers, there were many other occupations. The pig-breeder was not seen as a lowly profession if it was merely utilized by a poor scholar to pay for a formal education. For example, the first chancellor in Han to lack either a military background or a title as marquess was the pig-breeder Gongsun Hong (公孫弘) of Emperor Wu's reign. Physicians who practiced medicine and studied medical classics could not only make a decent income, but were also able to gain an education and become officials. The physician Hua Tuo (d. 208 CE) was nominated for office while another became Prefect of the Gentlemen of the Palace (郎中令). Those who practiced occult arts of Chinese alchemy and mediumship were often employed by the government to conduct religious sacrifices, while on rare occasions—such as with Luan Da (d. 112 BCE)—an occultist might marry a princesses or be enfeoffed as a marquess. While it was socially acceptable for gentry scholars to engage in the occult arts of divination and Chinese astrology, career diviners were of a lower status and earned only a modest income. Other humble occultist professions included sorcery and physiognomy; like merchants, those who practiced sorcery were banned from holding public office. Being a butcher was another lowly occupation, yet there is one case where a butcher became an official during Emperor Gaozu's reign, while Empress He (d. 189 CE) and her brother, the regent He Jin (d. 189 CE), came from a family of butchers. Runners and messengers who worked for the government were also considered to have a lowly status, yet some later became government officials.

=== Twenty ranks ===
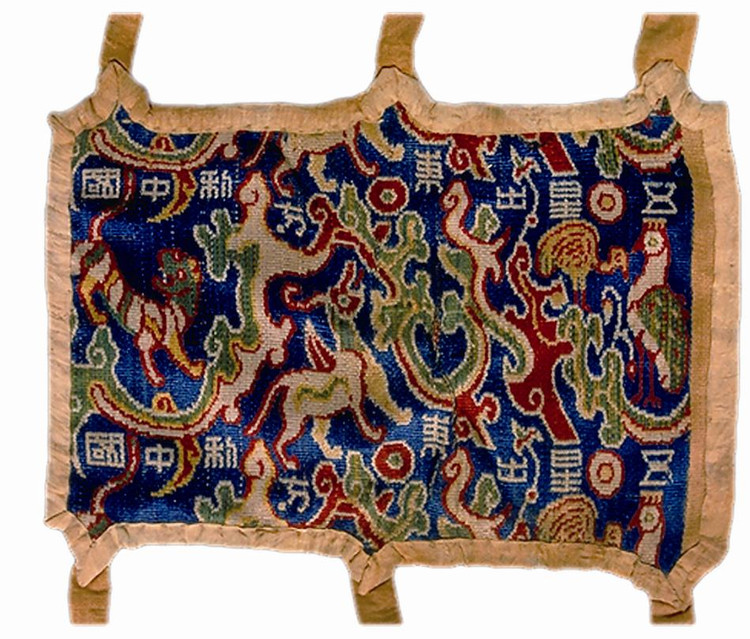
"Five stars rising in the East" armband, Eastern Han or early Jin era Sichuan brocade armband

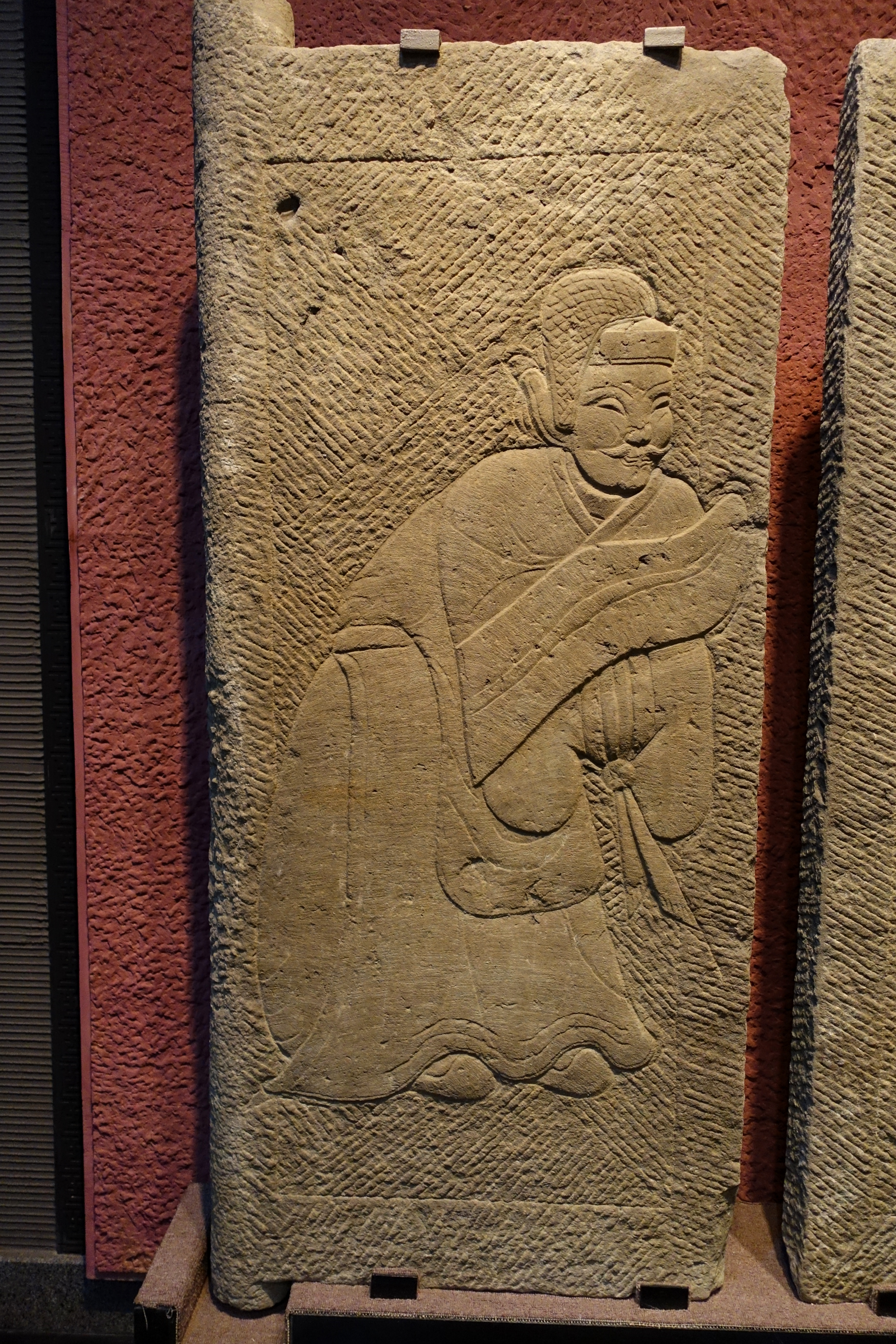
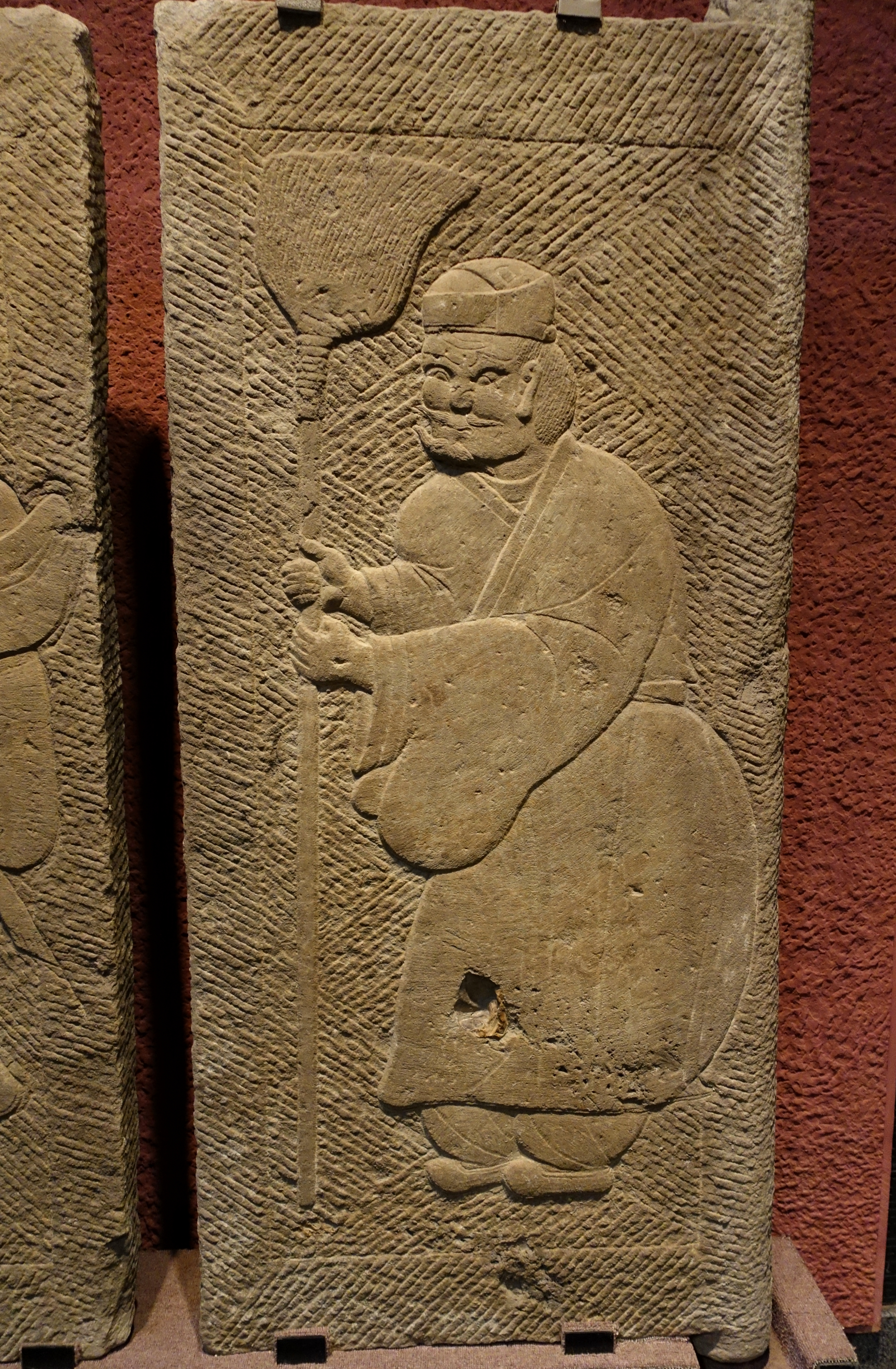
Carved reliefs on stone tomb doors showing men dressed in Hanfu, with one holding a shield, the other a broom, Eastern Han Dynasty (25–220 CE), from Lanjia Yard, Pi County, Sichuan province, Sichuan Provincial Museum of Chengdu

The Han court upheld a socio-economic ranking system for commoners and nobles, which was based on the twenty-ranks system installed by the statesman Shang Yang (d. 338 BCE) of the State of Qin. All males above the age of 15 (excluding slaves) could be promoted in rank up to level eight. When a commoner was promoted in rank, he was granted a more honorable place in the seating arrangements of hamlet banquets, was given a greater portion of hunted game at the table, was punished less severely for certain crimes, and could become exempt from labor service obligations to the state. This system favored the elderly, since a longer lifespan meant more opportunities to become promoted. In addition to an increase in salary (see table to the right), newly promoted men were granted wine and ox-meat for a celebratory banquet. The 19th and 20th ranks were both marquess ranks, yet only a 20th rank allowed one to have a marquessate fief.

Promotions in rank were decided by the emperor and could occur on special occasions, such as installation of a new emperor, inauguration of a new reign title, the wedding of a new empress, or the selection of a royal heir apparent. The central government sometimes sold ranks to collect more revenues for the state. The official Chao Cuo (d. 154 BCE) once wrote that anyone who presented a substantial amount of agricultural grain to the government would also be promoted in rank.

The twenty-ranks system (二十公乘)
Rank level and Chinese name	English translation	Annual salary measured in bushels or shi (石) of millet
1. 公士 Gongshi	Gentleman	50
2. 上造 Shangzao	Distinguished Accomplishment	100
3. 簪袅 Zanniao	Ornamented Horses	150
4. 不更 Bugeng	No Conscript Service	200
5. 大夫 Dafu	Grandee	250
6. 官大夫 Guan Dafu	Government Grandee	300
7. 公大夫 Gong Dafu	Gentleman Grandee	350
8. 公乘 Gongcheng	Gentleman Chariot	400
9. 五大夫 Wu Dafu	Grandee	450
10. 左庶长 Zuo Shuzhang	Chief of the Multitude on the Left	500
11. 右庶长 You Shuzhang	Chief of the Multitude on the Right	550
12. 左更 Zuo Geng	Chieftain of Conscripts on the Left	600
13. 中更 Zhong Geng	Chieftain of Conscripts in the Center	650
14. 右更 You Geng	Chieftain of Conscripts on the Right	700
15. 少上造 Shao Shangzao	Second-Order Distinguished Accomplishment	750
16. 大上造 Da Shangzao	Most Distinguished Accomplishment	800
17. 驷车庶长 Siju Shuzhang	Chieftain of the Multitude Riding a Four-Horse Chariot	850
18. 大庶长 Da Shuzhang	Grand Chieftain of the Multitude	900
19. 关内侯 Guannei Hou	Marquis of the Imperial Domain	950
20. 彻侯 Che Hou	Full Marquis	1,000

== Urban and rural life ==
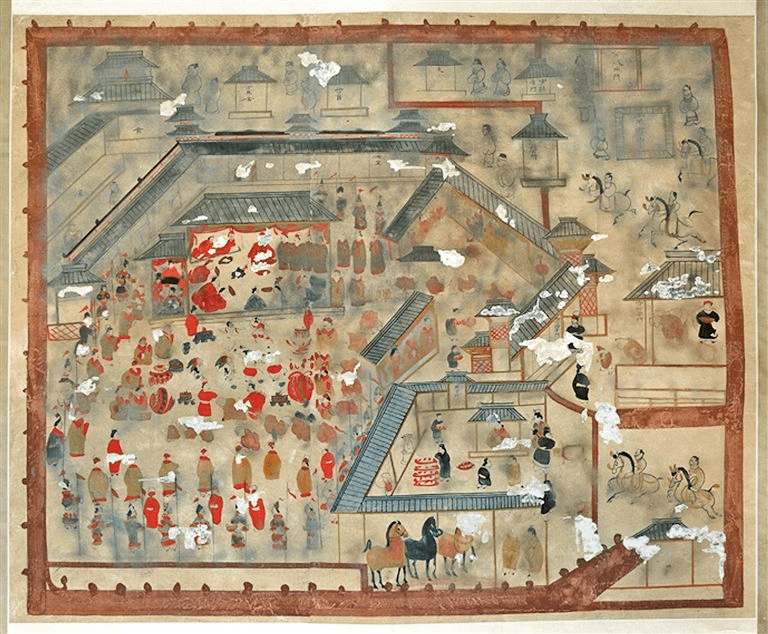
An Eastern Han (25–220) period Chinese mural of a mufu conference conducted by the Commandant-protector of the Wuhuan (护乌桓校尉) at his manor, from a Han tomb in Horinger, Inner Mongolia

During the Han, the empire was divided into large administrative units of kingdoms and commanderies; within a commandery there were counties, and within counties there were districts that contained at least several hamlets. An average hamlet contained about a hundred families and usually was enclosed by a wall with two gates. At the center of social life in the hamlet was the religious altar (built in honor of a local deity) where festivities could be staged. Each district and county also had an official religious altar. The official reach of government extended no further than the district level, where county-appointed officials included the chief of police who maintained law and order and the district tax collector. However, the government was able to control local society at the hamlet level with their bestowal of twenty ranks.

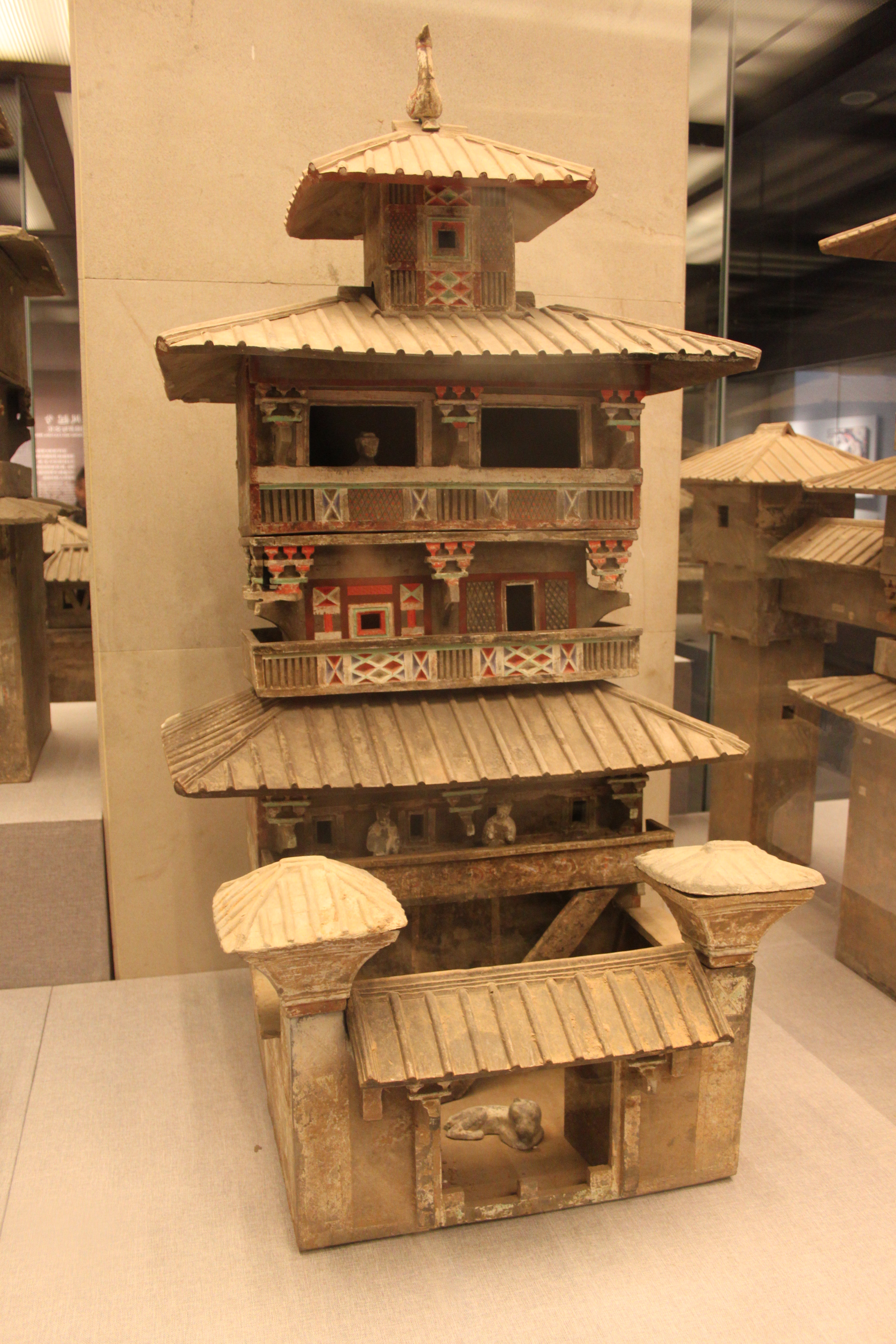
A Han ceramic tomb model of a multiple-story residential tower with a first-floor gatehouse and courtyard, mid-floor balcony, windows, and clearly distinguished dougong support brackets

The government funded flood control projects involving the building of new canals, thus aiding the speed of waterborne transport and allowing undeveloped areas to become irrigated farmlands. These conscription labor projects allowed for the building of new hamlets which were dependent on the government for their livelihoods. When the authority of the central government declined in the late Eastern Han period, many commoners living in such hamlets were forced to flee their lands and work as tenants on large estates of wealthy landowners. The people of older hamlets which never had to rely on central government projects for their wellbeing or existence often sought support from powerful local families.

The Western Han capital at Chang'an was divided into one hundred and sixty walled residential wards. Affairs of each ward were overseen by a low-ranking official. Influential families within the wards usually maintained social order. Historians are still unsure as to how many government-controlled marketplaces existed in Chang'an. Although there are claims of nine markets, it is possible that seven of them were actually divisible parts of two main markets: the East Market and West Market. Both the East Market and West Market had a two-story government office with a flag and drum placed on the roof. A market chief and deputy were headquartered in each of these buildings, yet not much is known about their involvement in the marketplace. In the Eastern Han capital of Luoyang, the market chief's office employed thirty-six sub-officers who ventured into the marketplace daily to maintain law and order. They also collected taxes on commercial goods, assigned standard prices for specific commodities on the basis of monthly reviews, and authorized contracts between merchants and their customers or clients. Besides merchants engaging in marketplace violations, other crimes were committed by adolescent street gangs who often wore clothes distinguishing their gang. The maintenance of law and order outside the market and in slum areas was conducted by constables; Han officials sometimes argued for increasing their salaries which they assumed would encourage them to reject bribes from criminals.

There were many amusements in the cities which could attract audiences rich and poor, such as trained animals performing tricks, cockfighting and caged animal fights between tigers, horse racing, puppet shows, musical performances with dancing, acrobatic feats, and juggling. Wealthy families could afford their own house choirs and five-piece orchestras with bells, drums, flutes, and stringed instruments. Gambling and board games such as liubo also provided entertainment.

== Marriage, gender, and kinship ==
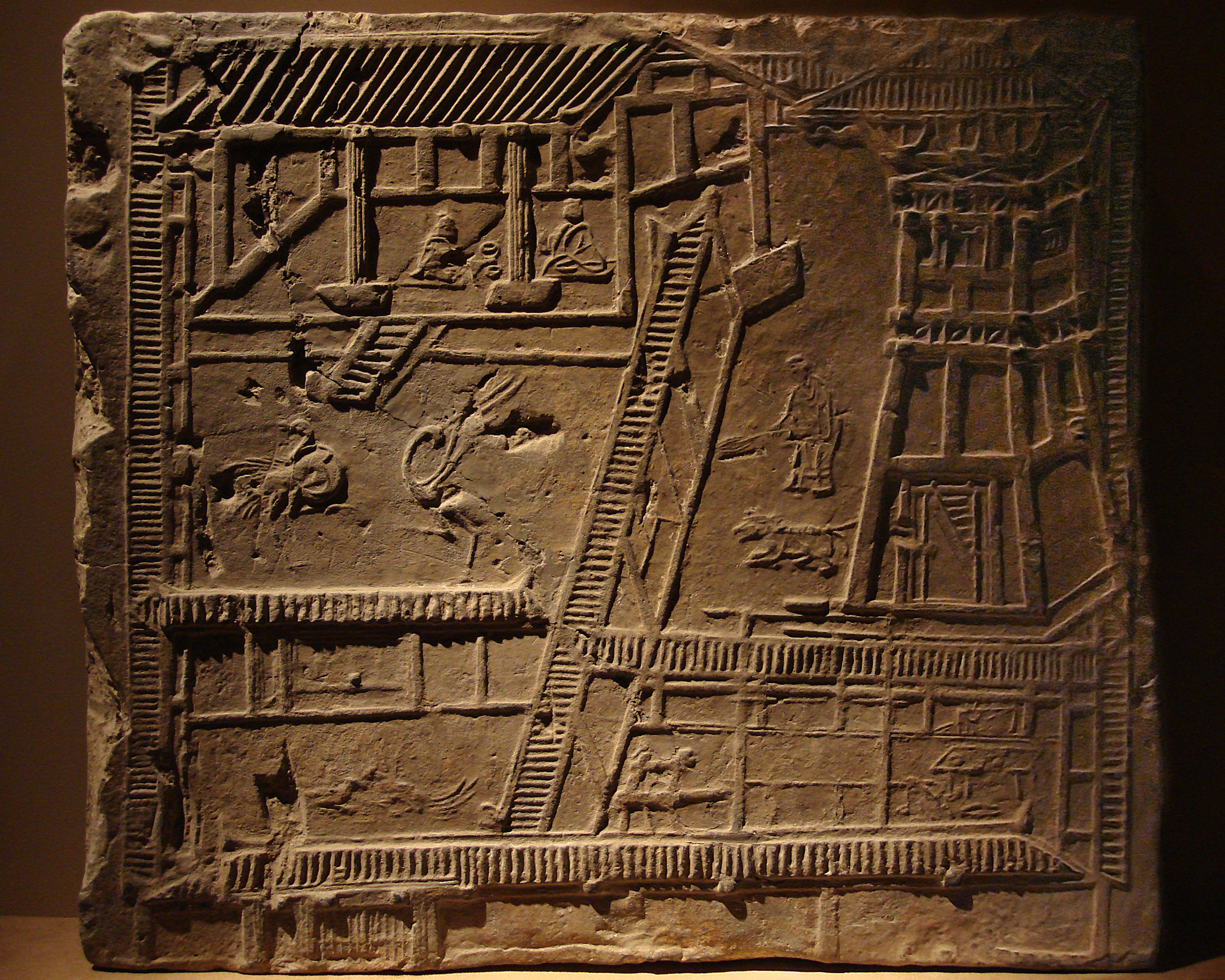
This brick, from the chamber wall of an Eastern-Han family tomb in what is now modern Sichuan, depicts the home of a wealthy, influential Han official; it features a walled courtyard, house, bedrooms, halls, kitchen, well, and a watchtower. The host and his guest sit and drink in the inner courtyard, while two roosters fight and two cranes dance.

=== Patrilineal, nuclear family ===
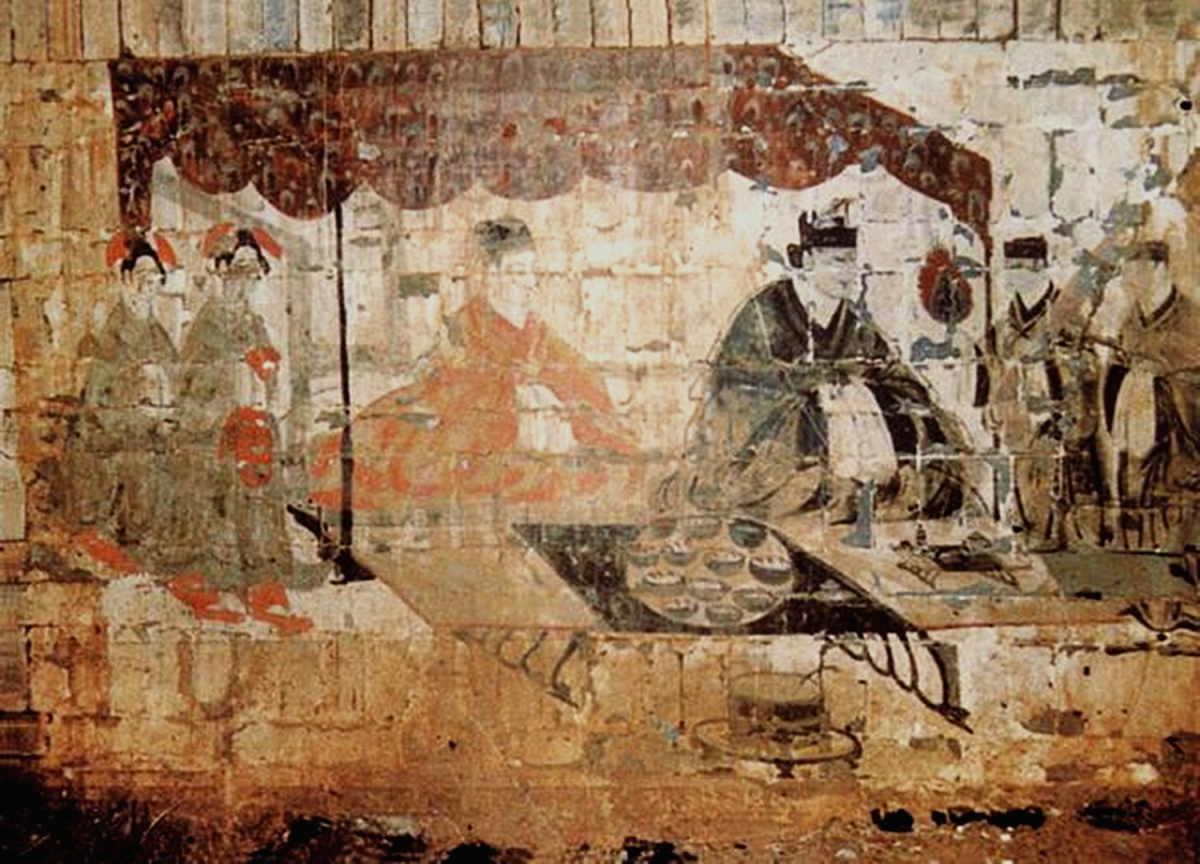
Eastern Han tomb mural depicting a husband and wife in a banquet attended by servants.

Chinese kinship relations during the Han were influenced by Confucian mores and involved both immediate nuclear family and extended family members. The Chinese family was patrilineal, since a father's sons did not consider a mother's kin to be part of their clan; instead, they were considered 'outside relatives'. The Han dynasty law code inherited the Qin dynasty (221–206 BCE) law that any family with more than two sons had to pay extra taxes. This was not repealed until the Cao Wei period (220–265 CE). The average Han family under one household typically had about four or five immediate family members, which was unlike the large extended families under one household in later dynasties. It was common during Han to send adult married sons away with a portion of the family fortune and visit them occasionally, yet in all dynasties during and after the Tang dynasty (618–907 CE), a son who moved away and lived separately from his living parents would be considered a criminal. Larger families appeared during the Eastern Han when some married brothers chose to live with each other's families. However, a household with three generations living under its roof was incredibly rare. This is in contrast to the Jin dynasty (266–420), when having three or more generations under one roof was commonplace.

=== Clan and lineage ===
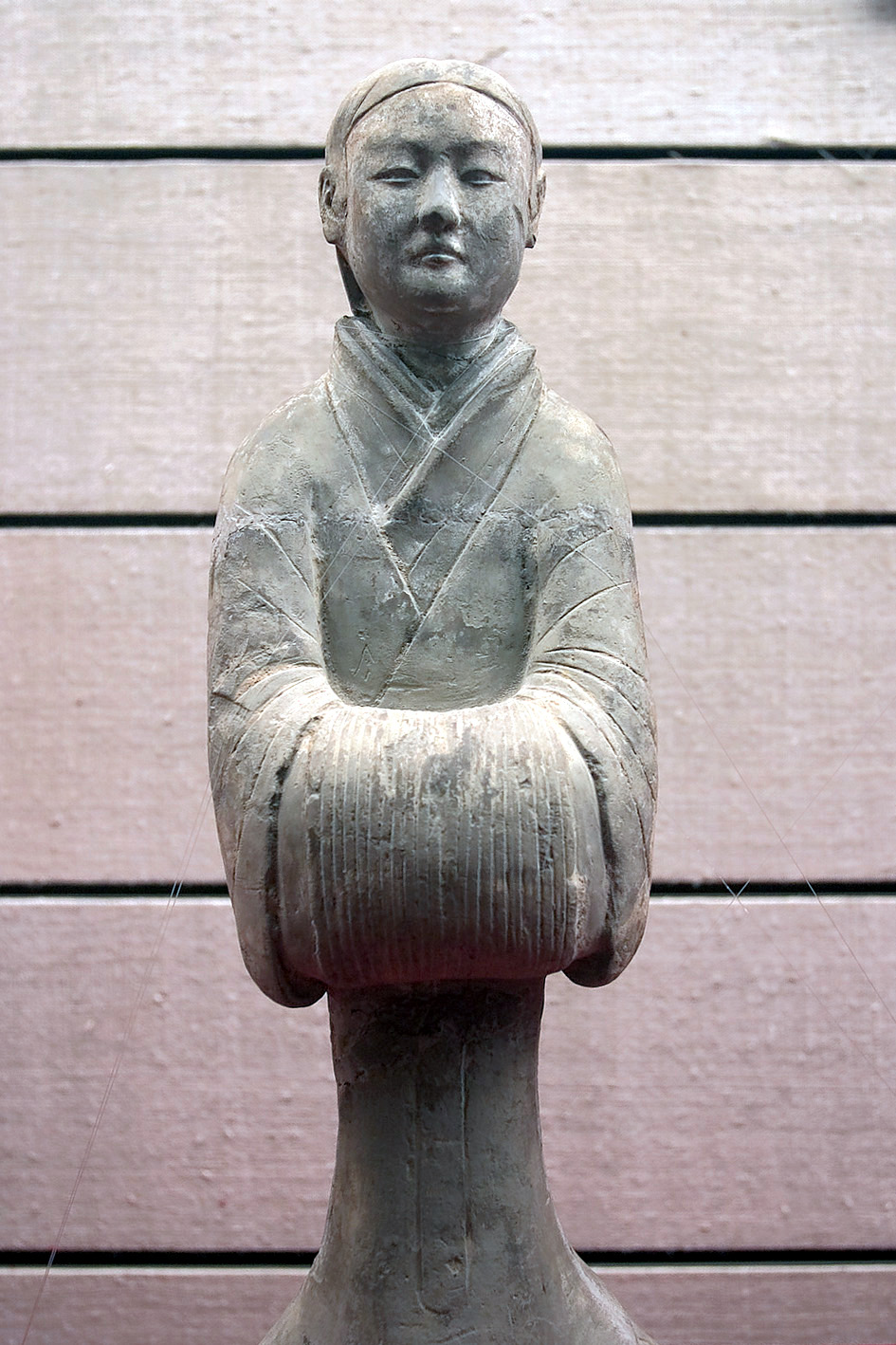
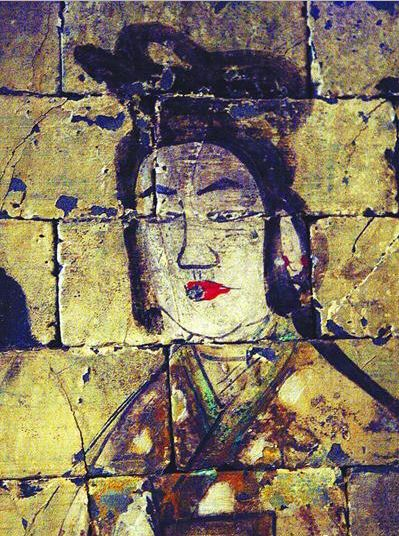
Left: a Han ceramic figurine of a lady servant with hands placed in front and covered in long silk sleeves
Right: a Western Han fresco of a woman in Hanfu robes, from a tomb of Xi'an (Chang'an), Shaanxi province

The Chinese clan or lineage involved men who shared a common patrilineal ancestor, yet were divided into subgroups whose behavior towards each other was regulated according to Confucian mores which dictated what relative should be closer and more intimate. The four different subgroups were: (1) brother, brother's sons, and brother's grandsons; (2) father's brothers, father's brother's sons and grandsons; (3) paternal grandfather's brothers, their sons, and grandsons; and (4) paternal great-grandfather's brothers, their sons, grandsons, and great-grandsons. While one was expected to mourn for an entire year over the death of any relative in the first subgroup, one was expected to mourn for only five months when a relative in the second subgroup had died. No ritual mourning was expected at all for relatives in the third and fourth subgroups. While a son mourned three years for a father's death, he only mourned one year for his mother's. Since carrying on the patrilineal line meant the continuation of ancestor worship, it was important to have at least one son, even if he was adopted from another family (although it was considered imperative that he share the same surname, otherwise his ancestral sacrifices could be considered null and void).

The majority of clan or lineage groups were not very influential in local society. However, prominent kinship groups could enjoy a great deal of ad hoc influence, especially if a member served as a government official. Wealthy scholars or officials often shared the same kinship group with poor commoners. Since clan members were expected to defend fellow members (even to the point of murder), government authorities constantly struggled to suppress powerful kinship groups. Local lineage groups formed the backbone of rebel forces in the popular uprising against Wang Mang in the early 1st century CE. When central government authority broke down in the late Eastern Han, less-developed areas of the country remained relatively stable due to entrenched kinship groups, while in heavily developed areas (where kinship groups had been effectively broken down by the state) there were many more peasants willing to turn to rebel movements for protection and survival.

=== Marriage and divorce ===
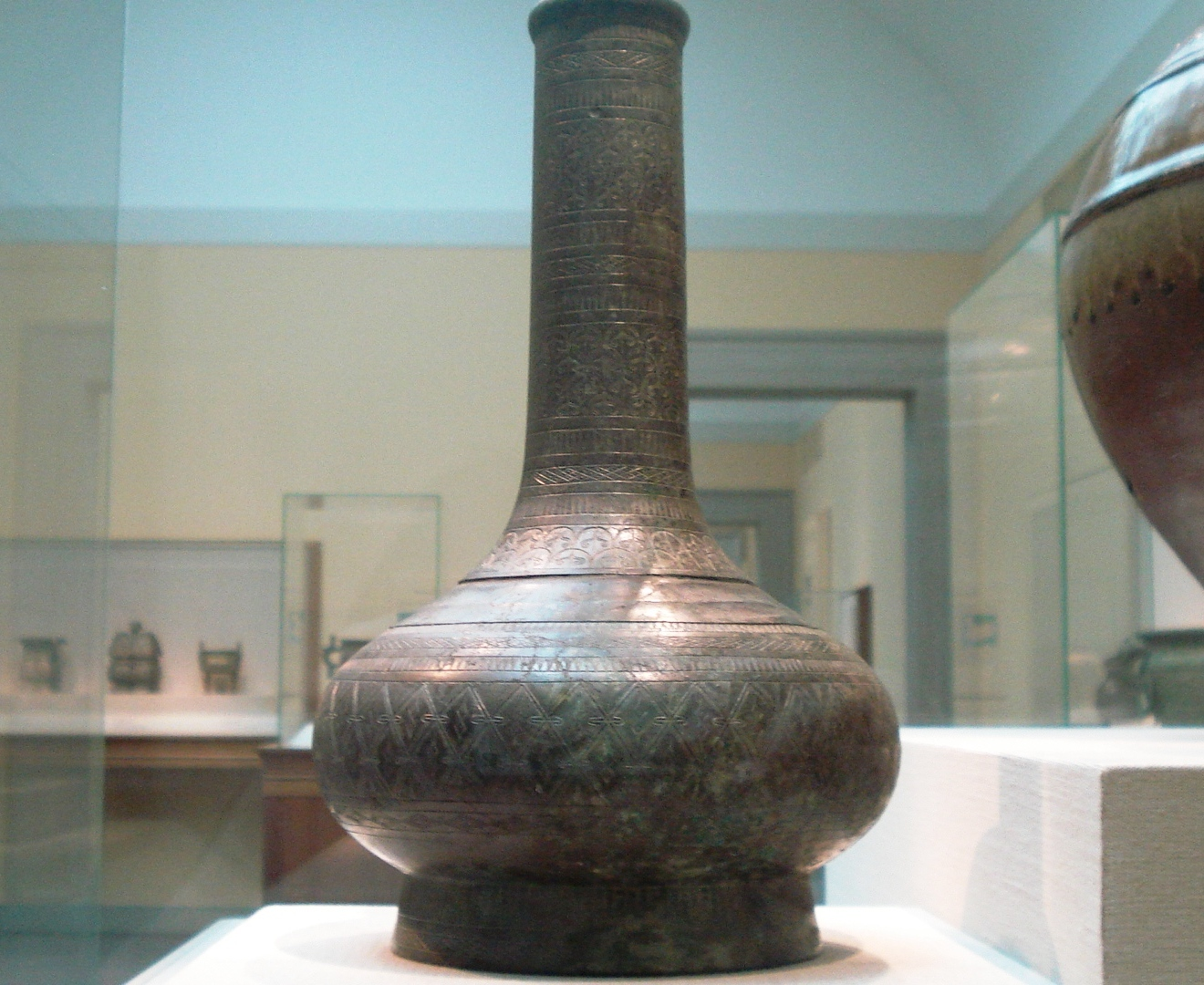
A Western-Han bronze gaming vessel dated c. 150–50 BCE, which was used during festivities by guests who would attempt to throw darts down its narrow neck

Although romantic love was not discouraged, marriages were arranged as agreements and bonds formed between two clans (with property as the chief concern), not necessarily two individuals. A father's input on who his sons and daughters should marry carried more weight than the mother, although a grandfather could override a father's decision. Once a couple had married, the new wife was obligated to visit the family temple so she could become part of the husband's clan and be properly worshipped by her descendants after death. However, she retained her natal surname. The vast majority of people during Han practiced monogamy, although wealthy officials and nobles could afford to support one or many concubines in addition to their legal wife.

Although the ideal ages for marriage were thirty for a man and twenty for a woman, it was common for a male to marry at age sixteen and a female at age fourteen. To encourage families to marry off their daughters, a law was introduced in 189 BCE that increased the poll tax rate fivefold for unmarried women between the ages of fifteen and thirty. People of the Han practiced a strict form of exogamy where one could not marry a person who had the same surname, even if both partners could not be traced back to a common ancestor (however, this excluded the royal family, who sometimes married distant relatives for political reasons). Officials often married into families with officials of equal status and sometimes married royal princesses or had their daughters marry kings and even the emperor.

By custom there were seven conditions where a man could divorce his wife. These were: (1) disobedience to parents-in-law, (2) barrenness (unable to continue family line), (3) adultery (mixing another clan's blood into the family), (4) jealousy (of concubines), (5) incurable disease (unable to continue family line), (6) loquacity (not getting along with brothers-in-law or sisters-in-law), and (7) theft. However, a husband was not allowed to divorce his wife if she had completed three years of mourning for one of his deceased parents, if there were no living relatives in her father's family to return to, or if the husband's family was originally poor but became rich after marriage. Sometimes women were also able to initiate the divorce and remarry if the husband's family was in poverty, he was diseased, or his in-laws were too abusive. Although remarriage was frowned upon (especially since divorce meant a wife took away her dowry wealth from her ex-husband's family), it was nonetheless common amongst divorcees and widowers in all social groups.

=== Inheritance ===
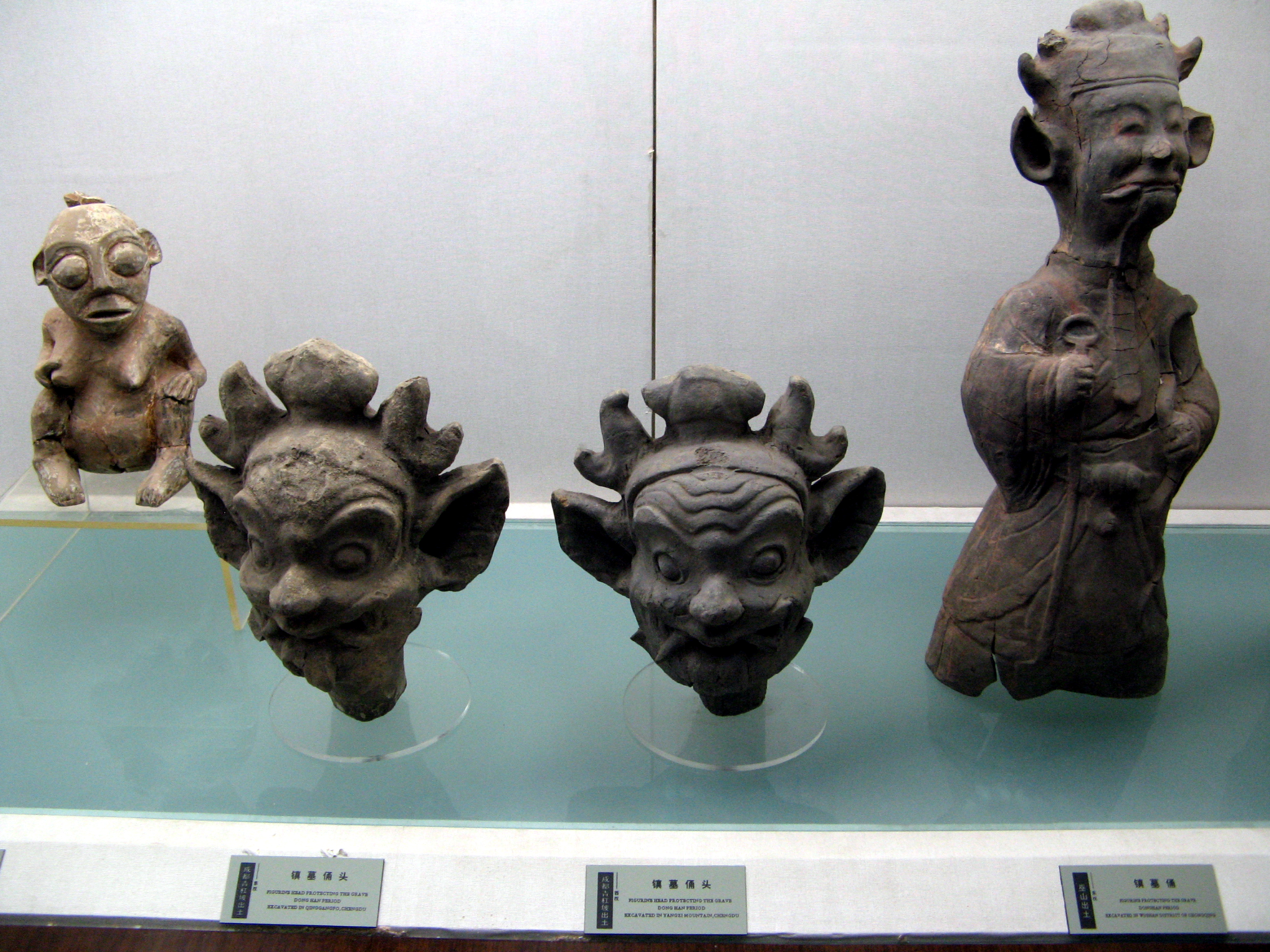
Ceramic figures of grotesque grave guardian heads, Eastern Han period (25–220 CE), Three Gorges Museum, Chongqing

The two types of inheritance during Han included the common inheritance of property from the deceased, which all social groups (except for slaves) participated in, and the inheritance of titles, which only the people of twenty ranks, nobility, and royalty could enjoy. In the first form, officials and commoners bequeathed an equal share of property to each of their sons in their will. This excluded daughters, who married into other families and thus did not carry on the family name. However, daughters did receive a portion of the family property in the form of their marriage dowries, which were sometimes equal to a brother's share of wealth in the will. The second type of inheritance involved the practice of primogeniture, where the official title was inherited by only one son. This was as true of the emperor as it was for any king, marquess, or commoner of the twenty ranks. However, to limit the power of the kings while still upholding primogeniture, an imperial edict of 127 BCE stated that kings had to divide the territories of their kingdoms between the chosen successor (i.e. heir apparent) and the kings' brothers, who were made marquesses, thus establishing new marquessates and effectively reducing the size of every kingdom with each generation.

=== Status and position of women ===
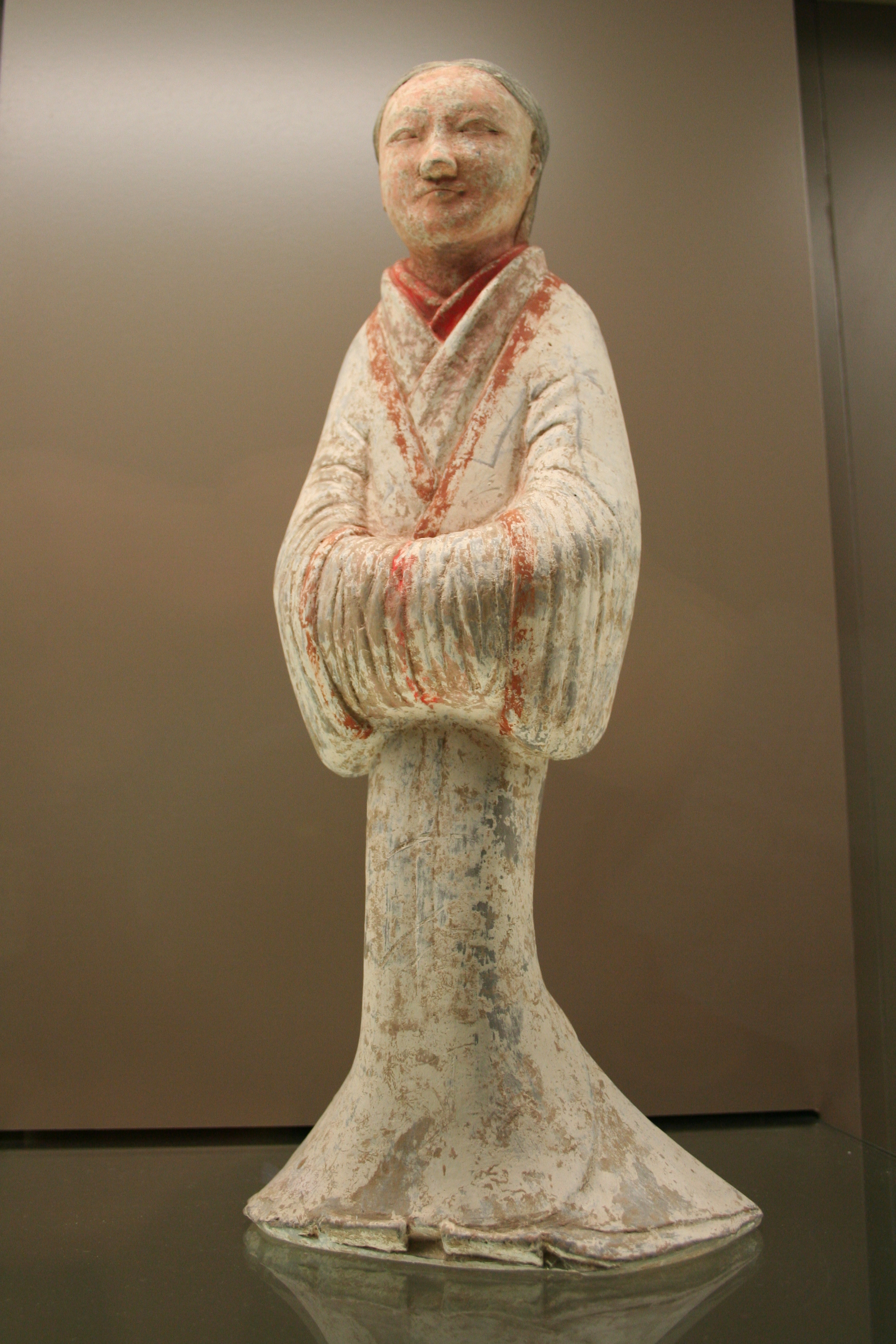
A Western-Han painted ceramic figurine of a female servant in silk robes

Historian Ban Zhao (45–116 CE) wrote in her Lessons for Women that, like the opposite and complementary forces of yin and yang, men's great virtues were strength and rigidity, while a woman's great virtues were respect and compliance. Throughout her life, a Han woman was to bend to the will of first her father, then her husband, and then her adult son (三從四德). However, there are many recorded deviations from this rule, as some Han women are written to have engaged in heated arguments with their husbands over concubines (sometimes beating concubines out of jealousy and to punish the husband), wrote essays and letters for husbands serving as government officials, and sometimes husbands turned to their wives for advice on political affairs of the court. When a father died, the eldest son was theoretically the senior member of the family, yet as hinted in various works of Han literature, they still had to obey the will of their mother and she could even force them to kowtow to her when apologizing for an offense. Deviations from common customs regarding gender were especially pronounced in the imperial family. The empress was able to give orders to her male relatives (even her father) and if they disobeyed her, she could publicly reprimand and humiliate them.

Certain occupations were traditionally reserved for women, while they were also exempted from corvée labor duties. Women were expected to rear children, weave clothes for the family, and perform domestic duties such as cooking; although farming was considered men's work, sometimes women tilled fields alongside their husbands and brothers. Some women formed communal spinning and weaving groups to pool resources together to pay for candles, lamp oil, and heat during night and winter. A successful textile business could employ hundreds of women. Singing and dancing to entertain wealthy patrons were other common professions open for women. When a husband died, sometimes the widow became the sole supporter of her children, and thus had to make a living weaving silk cloths or making straw sandals to sell in the market. Some women also turned to the humble profession of sorcery for income. Other more fortunate women could become renowned medical physicians who provided services to the families of high officials and nobility. Some wealthy women engaged in luxury trade, such as one who frequently sold pearls to a princess. Some even aided in their husband's business decisions. Female merchants dressed in silk clothes which rivaled even female nobles' attire were considered immoral compared to the ideal woman weaver.

== Education, literature, and philosophy ==
=== Competing ideologies ===
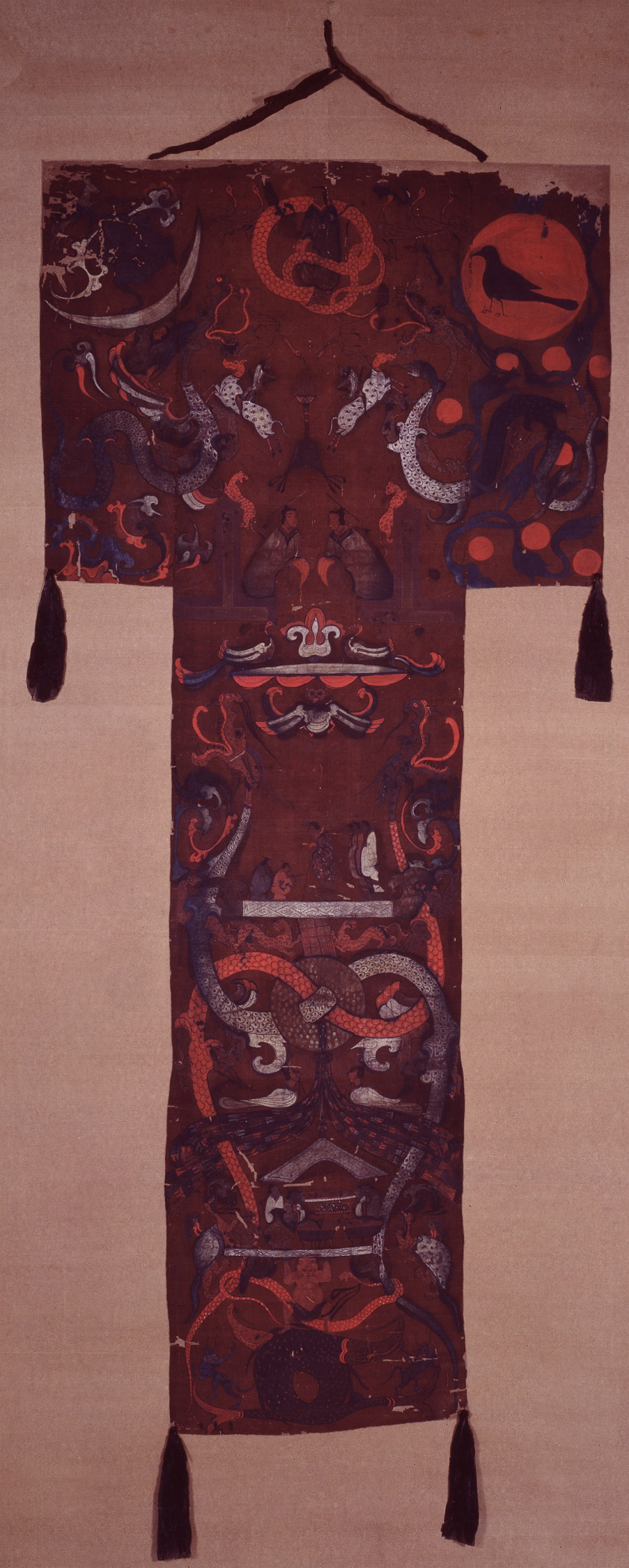
This 6 3/4-foot-long (2.1 m) Western-Han painting on silk was found draped over the coffin in the grave of Lady Dai (d. 168 BCE) at Mawangdui in Changsha, Hunan province, China. The scenes depicted on it seem to illustrate the journey of the woman's soul. The top section shows the heavenly realm, complete with dragons, leopards, and hybrid creatures. At the corners are the crow that symbolizes the Sun and the toad that symbolizes the Moon, the pairing of the Sun and Moon representing the cosmic forces of yin and yang.

The historian Sima Tan (d. 110 BCE) wrote that the Legalist tradition inherited by Han from the previous Qin dynasty taught that imposing severe man-made laws which were short of kindness would produce a well-ordered society, given that human nature was innately immoral and had to be checked. 'Legalism' was the label created by Han scholars to describe the socio-political philosophy formulated largely by Shen Buhai (d. 340 BCE), Shang Yang (d. 338 BCE), and Han Fei (c. 280 – c. 233 BCE), a philosophy which stressed that government had to rely on a strict system of punishments and rewards to maintain law and order. Some early Western Han officials were influenced by the tenet of 'nonaction' apparent in Han Fei's work and the Daoist Laozi. By utilizing this concept, they argued that once laws and administrative systems were set in place, the government functioned smoothly and intervention on behalf of the ruler became unnecessary. This school of thought was known as 'Yellow Emperor and Laozi' (Huang-Lao 黃老), which gained full acceptance at court under the patronage of Empress Dowager Dou (d. 135 BCE). Its followers believed that the originator of ordered civilization was the mythical Yellow Emperor, a view that contradicted later Confucian scholars' views that the mythological Yao and Shun were responsible for bringing man out of a state of anarchy. Works such as the Huainanzi (presented in 139 BCE) introduced new systematic ideas about the cosmos which undercut the message of Huang-Lao thought. Scholars such as Shusun Tong (叔孫通) began to express greater emphasis for ethical ideas espoused in 'Classicist' philosophical works such as those of Kongzi (i.e. Confucius, 551–479 BCE), an ideology anachronistically known as Confucianism. Emperor Gaozu found Shusun Tong's Confucian reforms of court rituals useful so long as they further exalted his status, yet it was not until Emperor Wu's reign that Confucianism gained exclusive patronage at court.

=== Confucianism becomes paramount ===
At the core of Confucian ethics were the selected virtues of filial piety, harmonious relationships, ritual, and righteousness. The amalgamation of these ideas into a theological system involving earlier cosmological theories of yin and yang as well as the five phases (i.e. natural cycles which governed Heaven, Earth, and Man) was first pioneered by the official Dong Zhongshu (179–104 BCE). Although full authenticity of Dong's authorship of the Luxuriant Dew of the Spring and Autumn Annals comes into question with hints that parts were rewritten around the time of Liu Xiang (79–8 BCE) or Liu Xin (d. 23 CE), three of his original memorials sent to the throne discussing his syncretic version of Confucianism were preserved in the 1st-century-CE Book of Han.

Since his model incorporated and justified the imperial government into the natural order of the universe, it appealed to Emperor Wu, who in 136 BCE abolished non-Confucian academic chairs or erudites (博士) not dealing with the Confucian Five Classics: the Classic of Poetry, the Classic of Changes, the Classic of Rites, the Classic of History, and the Spring and Autumn Annals. Expanding on the position of Mengzi (c. 372 – 289 BCE) that human nature was innately good, Dong wrote that people needed external nourishment of education to become 'awakened' and develop morality. To produce morally sound officials, Emperor Wu further sponsored Confucian education when he established the Imperial University in 124 BCE. Despite mainstream acceptance of Confucianism for the rest of Han (and until the end of the Qing dynasty in 1911), philosophers still defended some Legalist ideas while the state's laws and policies reflect a compromise reached between Legalism and Han Confucianism.

There were varying regional traditions or 'schools' within Confucianism assigned to certain texts. The two which caused most debate were New Texts and Old Texts traditions. The former represented works transmitted orally after the Qin book burning of 213 BCE, and the latter was newly discovered texts alleged by Kong Anguo, Liu Xin, and others to have been excavated from the walls of Kongzi's home, displayed archaic written characters, and thus were more authentic versions. Although initially rejected, the Old Texts found acceptance at the courts of Emperor Ping (r. 1 BCE – 5 CE) and Wang Mang, were rejected by Emperor Guangwu, and accepted once more by Emperor Zhang only to be rejected a third time by the following rulers.

=== Further philosophical synthesis ===
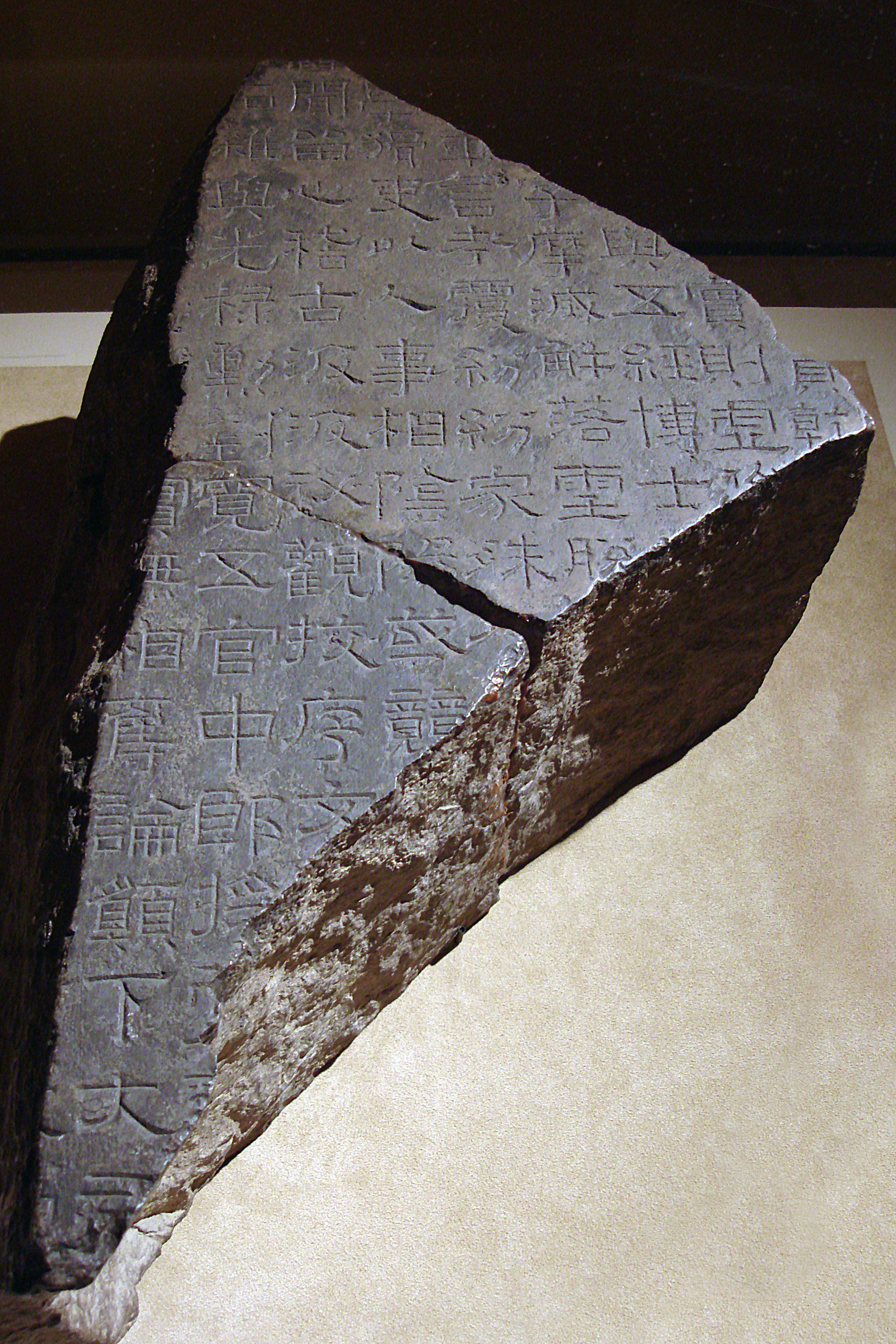
A fragment of the 'Stone Classics' (熹平石經); these stone-carved Five Classics installed during Emperor Ling's reign along the roadside of the Imperial University (right outside Luoyang) were made at the instigation of Cai Yong (132–192 CE), who feared the Classics housed in the imperial library were being interpolated by University Academicians.

In contrast to Dong's certainty about innate goodness, the contemporary writer Jia Yi (201–169 BCE) synthesized the opposing perspectives of Mengzi and Xunzi (c. 312 – c. 230 BCE) in the chapter "Protecting and Tutoring" (Baofu 保傅) of his book New Recommendations (Xinshu 新書) to argue that human nature was malleable and thus neither originally good or evil. Han Confucianism was transformed in the Eastern Han period when scholars struggled to understand how Wang Mang's regime had failed despite its great sponsorship of Confucian reform. The transition from Western Han idealism to Eastern Han skepticism can be represented in part by the Exemplary Sayings (Fayan 法言) of Yang Xiong (53 BCE – 18 CE), who argued that human nature was indeterminate, that one could cultivate good and escape negative situations by learning the valuable precepts of many schools of thought (not just Confucianism), yet man had no control over his ultimate fate (命) decided by Heaven. In his New Discussions (Xinlun 新論), Huan Tan (43 BCE −28 CE) argued that although the Han court sponsored Confucian education, the government had become corrupt and thus undermined Dong Zhongshu's cosmically ordained belief that Confucian education went hand-in-hand with political success. In his Balanced Discourse (Lunheng), Wang Chong (27–100 CE) argued that human life was not a coherent whole dictated by a unitary will of Heaven as in Dong's synthesis, but rather was broken down into three planes: biological (mental and physical), sociopolitical, and moral, elements which interacted with each other to produce different results and random fate. Eastern Han Confucians incorporated ideas of Legalism and Daoism to explain how society could be salvaged, such as Wang Fu (78–163 CE) in his Comments of a Recluse (Qian fu lun) who argued that the evils accumulated by mankind over time could be rectified by direct engagement of the body-politic (the Legalist approach), but that the individual had to cultivate personal virtue in the meantime as a long-term solution (the Daoist approach).

=== Public and private education ===
In order to secure a position as a teacher, erudite in the capital, or government official, a student could choose one of several paths to become well educated. Perhaps the most prestigious path was enrollment in the Imperial University. Students had to be above the age of eighteen to enroll, and were selected by the Minister of Ceremonies from those recommended by local authorities. Other students could choose to enroll in a school sponsored by the local commandery government. A professional teacher who opened a private school in a small town or village could sometimes gather a following of several hundred to over a thousand students. Students were expected to pay tuition, thus a teacher enjoyed a significant salary. His standing in the local community was usually paramount, and was even sought as an arbiter in disputes. Although the size of the Imperial Academy was greatly expanded in Eastern Han, private schools grew in importance as the imperial government lost authority and its academy's persecution of Old Text tradition drove many to pursue Old Text studies in private institutions.

=== The Standard Histories ===
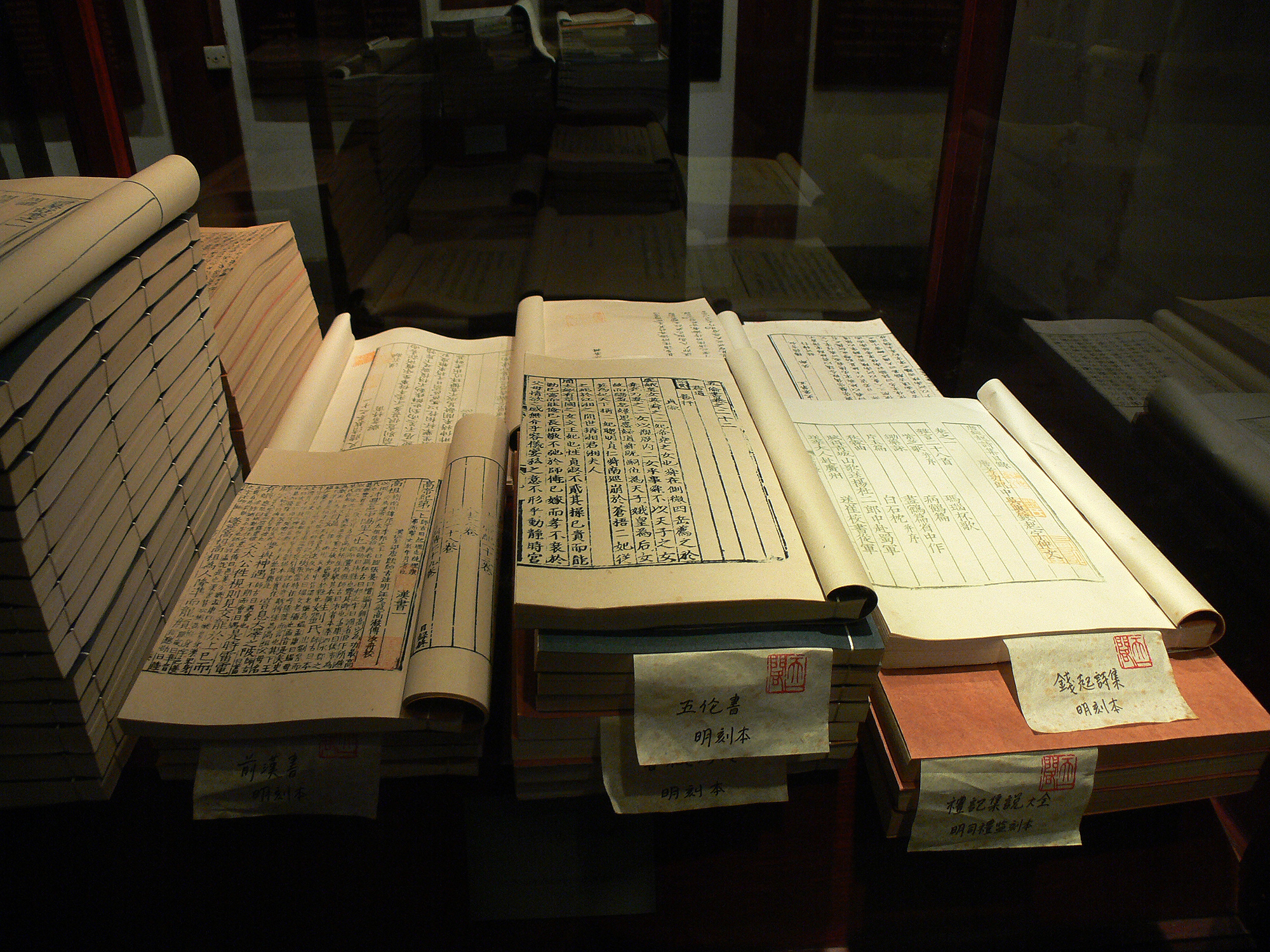
A Ming dynasty woodblock print edition of the Book of Han

Before the Records of the Grand Historian (Shiji) by Sima Qian (145–86 BCE), there existed terse chronicles of events such as the Spring and Autumn Annals and the chronicle found at Shuihudi covering events in the State of Qin and Qin dynasty from 306 to 217 BCE. There was also the Classic of History—part of the Confucian canon—which recorded the deeds of past rulers and political events (sometimes mythological instead of historical). However, Sima's work is considered the first of China's Standard Histories, laid the groundwork for Chinese historiography by creating the first universal history of China. He divided his work of one hundred and thirty chapters into basic annals, chronological tables in grid format (with year-by-year accounts since 841 BCE, the start of the Gonghe Regency), treatises on general subjects (such as the economy and the calendar), histories of hereditary houses and states, biographies on individuals arranged in roughly chronological order, and his own autobiography as the last chapter. Being a court archivist allowed Sima to utilize eighty textual sources in addition to memorials, edicts, and stone inscriptions. These sources enhanced the enormous scope of his work, which mentions roughly four thousand people by name. He also traveled extensively to interview witnesses for more recent accounts.

Unlike the Western historiographical tradition established by the Greek Herodotus (c. 484 c. – 425 BCE), University of North Carolina associate professor Dr. Grant Hardy asserts that Sima's work was intended to be a textual microcosm representing every aspect of the Universe, Earth, and Man in model form, in much the same way that the raised-relief map in the tomb of Qin Shi Huang (r. 221–210 BCE) represented his empire. Hardy explains that this was not unique to Sima's work, as Han scholars believed encoded secrets existed in the Spring and Autumn Annals, which was deemed "a microcosm incorporating all the essential moral and historical principles by which the world operated" and future events could be prognosticated. However, Hardy's microcosm thesis as an explanation for the Shiji's inconsistencies in ideological approach, organization, and literary characteristics has been criticized by Michael Loewe and David Schaberg. They express doubt about Hardy's view that Sima intended his work to be a well-planned, homogeneous model of reality, rather than a loosely connected collection of narratives which retains the original ideological biases of the various sources used.

The next Standard History was the Book of Han, compiled by Ban Biao (3–54 CE), his son Ban Gu (32–92 CE), and his daughter Ban Zhao (45–116 CE). Unlike Sima's private and independent work, this history text was commissioned and sponsored by the Han court under Emperor Ming (r. 57–75 CE), who let Ban Gu use the imperial archives. This set a significant precedent for the rest of the Standard Histories, since the historian was now virtually unable to criticize his ruling patron. The Book of Han covered the history of China left off from Sima's work during Emperor Wu's reign up until the middle Eastern Han. Although the Records of the Three Kingdoms included events in late Eastern Han, no history work focused exclusively on the Eastern Han period until the Book of Later Han was compiled by Fan Ye (398–445 CE).

=== Treatises, dictionaries, manuals, and biographies ===
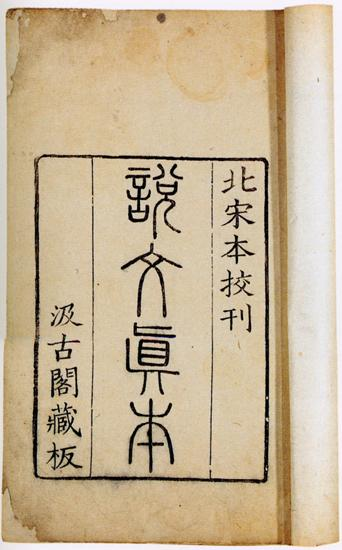
The cover of a modern reprint of a Northern Song (960–1127 CE) edition of Shuowen Jiezi

The Ready Guide (Erya) is the oldest known Chinese dictionary and was compiled sometime in the 3rd century BCE before the Han. Dictionaries written during the Han dynasty include Yang Xiong's Regional Speech (Fangyan) of 15 BCE and Xu Shen's (c. 58 – c. 147 CE) Explaining Unitary Characters and Analyzing Compound Characters (Shuowen Jiezi) of 121 CE. Yang Xiong's Fangyan was the first Chinese dialect vocabulary work; the modern Chinese term for 'dialect' is derived from the title of this book. In the Shuowen Jiezi, Xu Shen divided written characters between wen (文) and zi (字), where the former were original pictographs and the latter were characters derived from them. Listing 9,353 characters with 1,163 variant forms, Xu arranged these into 540 section headers according to their written radicals. This convenient and systematic approach of arranging characters by their radicals became the standard for all Chinese dictionaries to follow.

Handbooks, guides, manuals, and treatises for various subjects were written in the Han. The Western Han Book of Fan Shengzhi (Fan Shengzhi shu) written during Emperor Cheng's reign is one of two manuals on agricultural techniques and processes that have survived from the Han. The other is the Eastern Han Monthly Instructions for the Four Classes of People (Simin yueling 四民月令) written by Cui Shi (催寔) (d. 170 CE). Mathematical treatises included the Book on Numbers and Computation (Suan shu shu) The Arithmetical Classic of the Gnomon and the Circular Paths of Heaven (Zhoubi Suanjing), and the Nine Chapters on the Mathematical Art (Jiuzhang Suanshu). There were also works on astronomy, such as the Miscellaneous Readings of Cosmic Patterns and Pneuma Images (Tianwen qixiang zazhan 天文氣象雜占) from the 2nd-century-BCE Mawangdui Silk Texts and Zhang Heng's (78–139 CE) Spiritual Constitution of the Universe (Lingxian 靈憲) published in 120 CE.

Aside from the biographies found in the Standard Histories, it became popular amongst gentrymen to write stylistic essays and commission private biographies on other gentlemen. These privately published biographies focused either on gentrymen from one's locality or more well known figures who held national prominence.

=== Poetry and rhapsodies ===
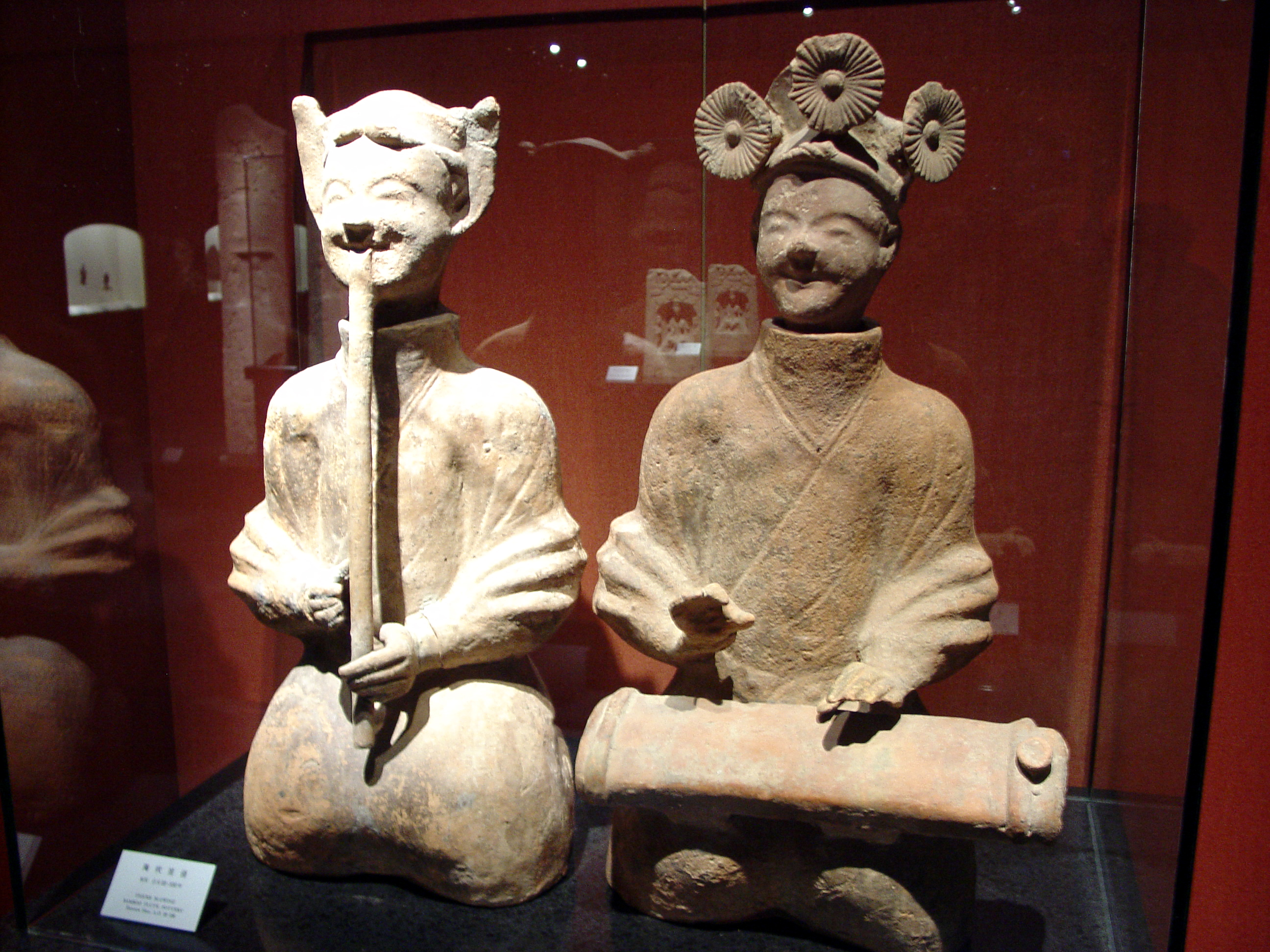
Lively musicians playing a bamboo flute and a plucked instrument, Chinese ceramic statues from the Eastern Han period (25–220 CE), Shanghai Museum

The rhapsody, known as fu in Chinese, was a new literary genre. The poet and official Sima Xiangru (179–117 BCE) wrote several rhapsodies, yet his largest and most influential was the "Rhapsody on the Son of Heaven on a Leisurely Hunt" (Tianzi Youlie Fu 天子遊獵賦) written in debate form. Sima's rhapsodies incorporated literary elements found in the Songs of Chu—an anthology of poems attributed to Qu Yuan (340–278 BCE) and Song Yu (fl. 3rd century BCE)—such as flying with heavenly immortals. Yang Xiong was the other prominent fu writer of Western Han, and although he at first praised Sima's work, he later criticized it as an example of the genre's shortcomings. In Eastern Han, Ban Gu wrote a rhapsody comparing the capital cities Chang'an and Luoyang, in which he concluded that Luoyang was the better of the two (which was a subtle praise of the current emperor, hinting that his virtue surpassed the rulers of Western Han). The court astronomer and inventor Zhang Heng (78–139 CE) also wrote rhapsodies on the capital cities which were inspired by those of Ban Gu. Zhang also penned the rhapsody "Returning to the Fields", which fused Daoist and Confucian ideals as well as laid the groundwork for later metaphysical nature poetry.

Zhang Heng also wrote "Lyric Poems on Four Sorrows" (四愁詩), which represent the earliest heptasyllabic shi poems in Chinese literature. The government's Music Bureau also produced folk songs and yuefu, a lyrical form of verse that became a standard subgenre of shi poetry. These poems focused largely on issues of morality that Confucian scholars found acceptable and in-line with Zhou dynasty traditions. Poets of the Jian'an (建安) period (196–220 CE) usually attended the same social events to compose poems on a given topic in one another's company.

== Laws and customs ==
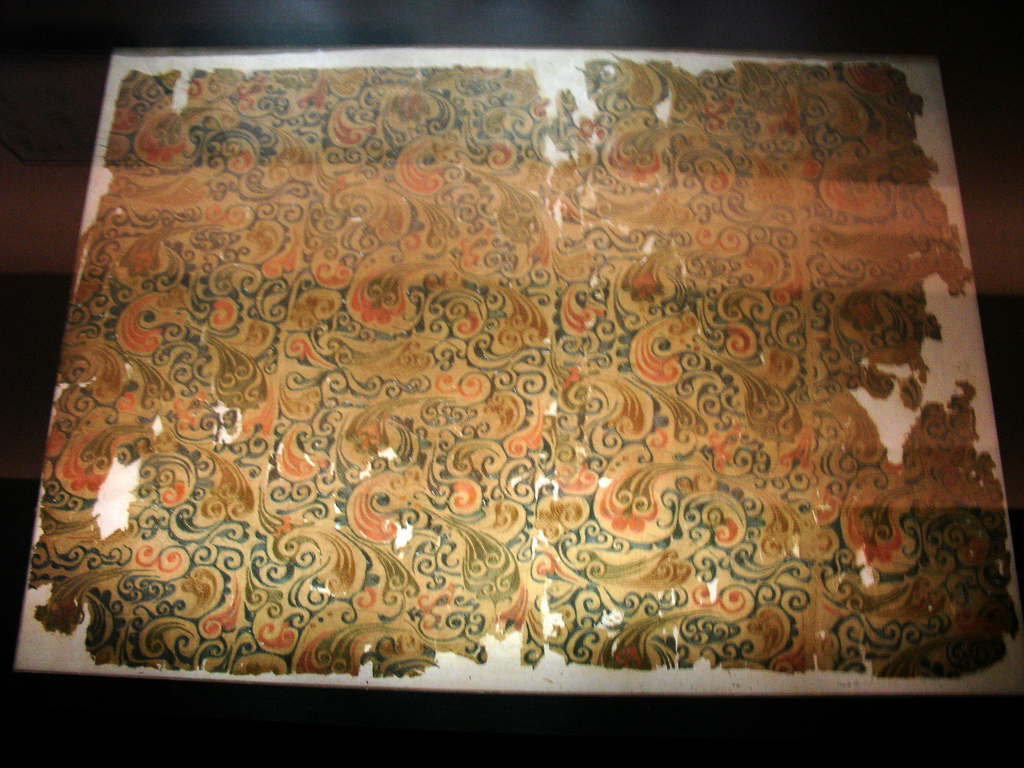
Silk textile from Tomb no. 1 at Mawangdui Han tombs site, 2nd century BCE, Western Han; according to sumptuary laws, registered merchants were barred from wearing silk, yet this was commonly flouted and hard to enforce.

By the Han dynasty, written law had matured from its archaic form based largely on natural law and social customs into a rational corpus influenced by politics and based on positive law. However, the Han dynasty law code established by Chancellor Xiao He (d. 193 BCE) was largely an extension of an existing Qin dynasty law code. Evidence for this includes archaeological finds at Qin-era Shuihudi and Han-era Zhangjiashan. The nine chapters of the law code consisted of statutes which dealt with criminality, while two of these chapters dealt with court procedure. Although it survives only in small fragments, it was allegedly a massive written work on 960 written scrolls. The code had 26,272 articles written in 7,732,200 words that outlined punishments. There were 490 articles on the death penalty alone which contained 1,882 offenses and 3,472 analogies or pieces of case law.

The county magistrate and commandery administrator were the official court judges of the county and commandery, respectively. Their jurisdictions overlapped, yet the commandery administrator only interfered in county court cases when necessary; it was generally agreed that whoever arrested a criminal first would be the first to judge him or her. If a commandery-level court case could not be resolved, the central government's Commandant of Justice was the final authority of appeal before the emperor. Yet he most often dealt with cases of political rebels and regicide in regards to kings, marquesses, and high officials. Above the Commandant was the emperor, the supreme judge and lawgiver.

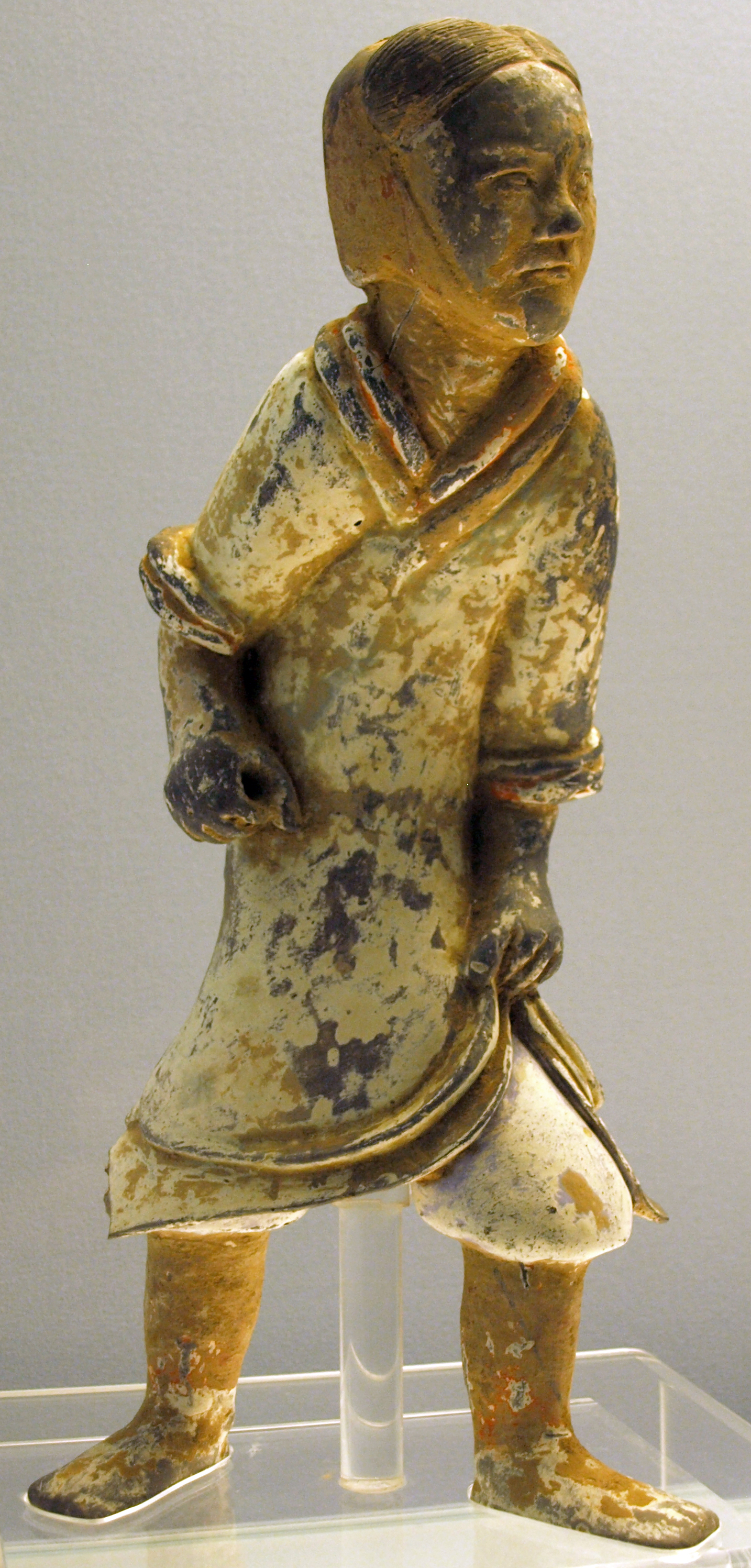
An Eastern Han painted ceramic statuette of a soldier, now missing a weapon from his right hand

As with previous codes, Han law distinguished what should be considered murderous killings (with malice and foresight), wittingly killing, killing by mistake, and killing by accident. Although a father was the undisputed head of the family, he was not allowed to mutilate or kill any of its members as punishment; if he did, he would be tried for physical assault or murder, respectively. Yet not all murders were given the same sentence, since relation and circumstance were considered in the sentencing. For example, A father would be given a much less severe sentence for murdering a son than if a son murdered his father. Women had certain rights under Han law. It was against the law for husbands to physically abuse their wives. Rape cases were also commonly filed in court and were punished by Han law. Women could level charges against men in court, while it was commonly accepted in Han jurisprudence that women were capable of telling the truth in court.

Sometimes criminals were beaten with the bastinado to gain confessions, but Han scholars argued that torture was not the best means of gaining confession, while court conferences were called into session to decide how many strokes should be given and what size the stick should be so as not to cause permanent injury. Imprisonment was an unheard of form of punishment during Han; common punishments were the death penalty by beheading, periods of forced hard labor for convicts, exile, or monetary fines. Mutilating punishments also existed in early Han, borrowed from previous practice in Qin. This included tattooing the face, cutting off the nose, castration, and amputation of one or both feet, yet by 167 BCE these were abolished in favor of lengthy floggings with the bastinado. Further reforms were implemented by the first year of Emperor Jing's (r. 154–141 BCE) reign which decreased the number of strokes a prisoner could receive from the bastinado. Starting in 195 BCE, those aged seventy and older were exempt from mutilating punishments. Further reforms exempted those aged seventy and older from harsh interrogation methods in cases other than false accusation and murder.

Although modern scholars know of some surviving cases where Han law dealt with commerce and domestic affairs, the spheres of trade (outside the monopolies) and the family were still largely governed by age-old social customs. Many ways in which family relations were conducted during the Han were already stipulated in the ancient Confucian canon, especially in the Book of Rites. This became accepted as the mainstream guide to ethics and custom. In terms of private commercial contracts, they usually entailed information on the goods transferred, the amount paid, the names of the buyer and seller, the date of transfer and the signatures of witnesses.

== Arts and crafts ==
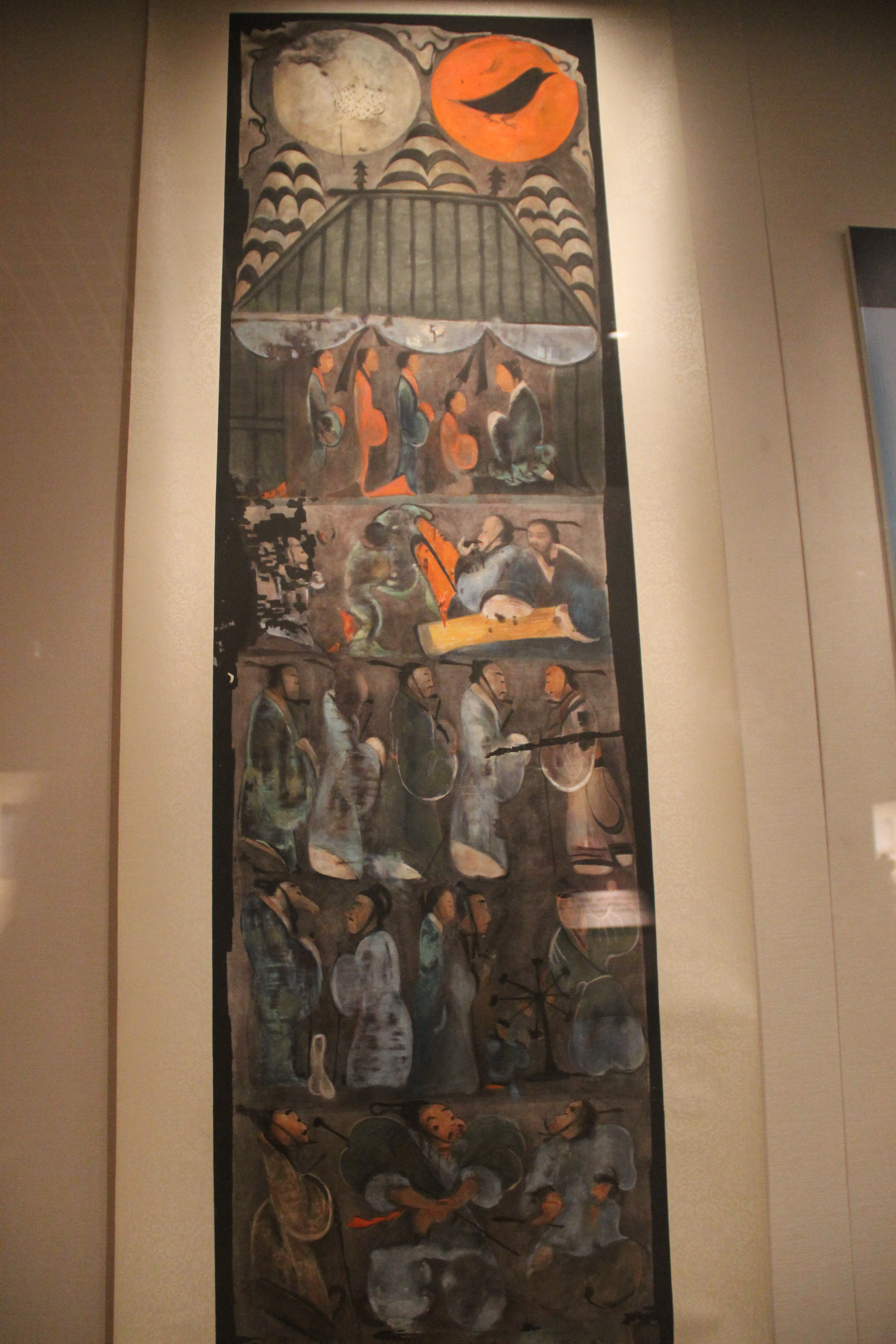
Western Han silk painting.

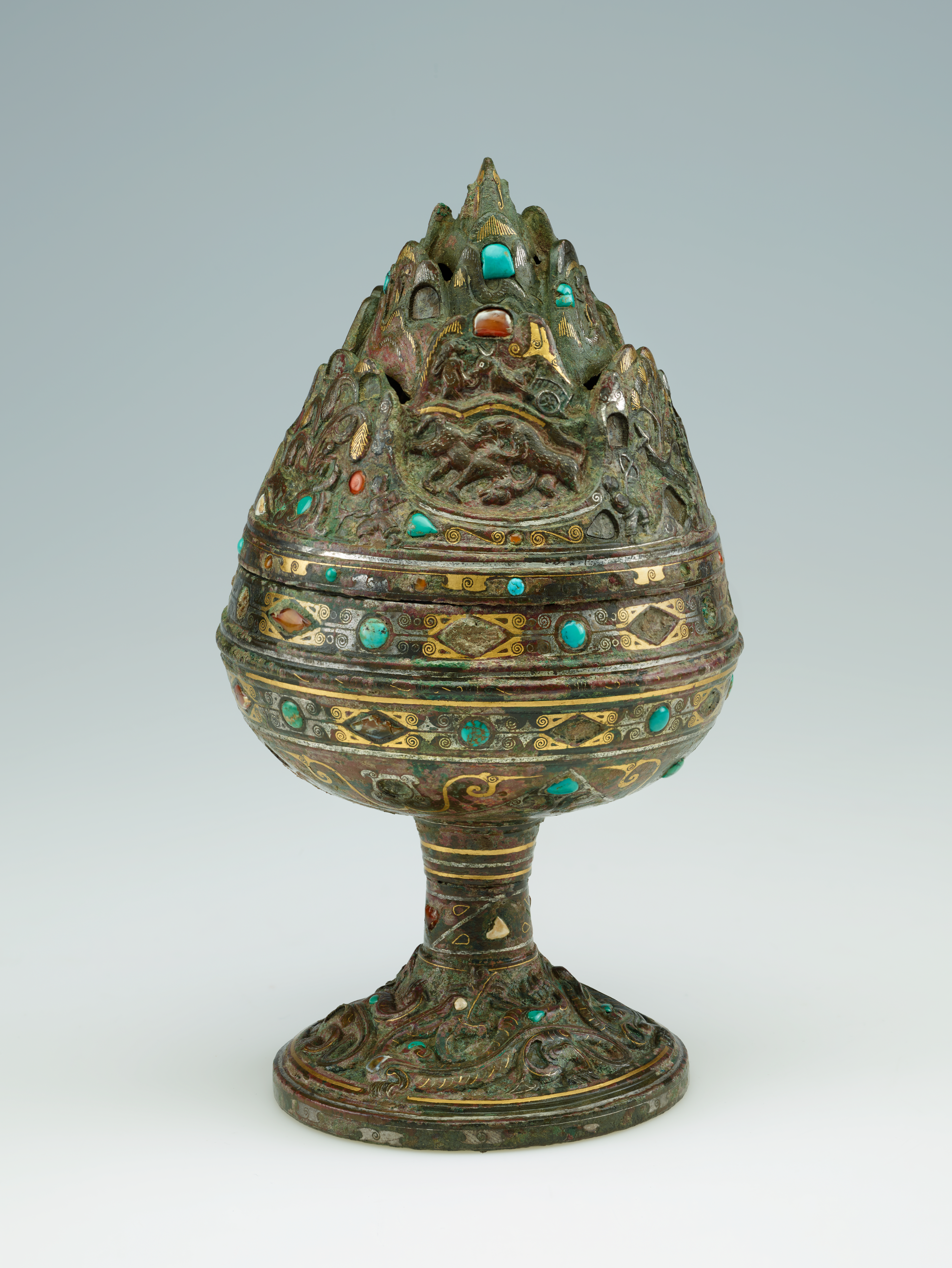
Lidded bronze incense burner with inlays of precious stones and metal, decorated with geometric motifs and narrative scenes.

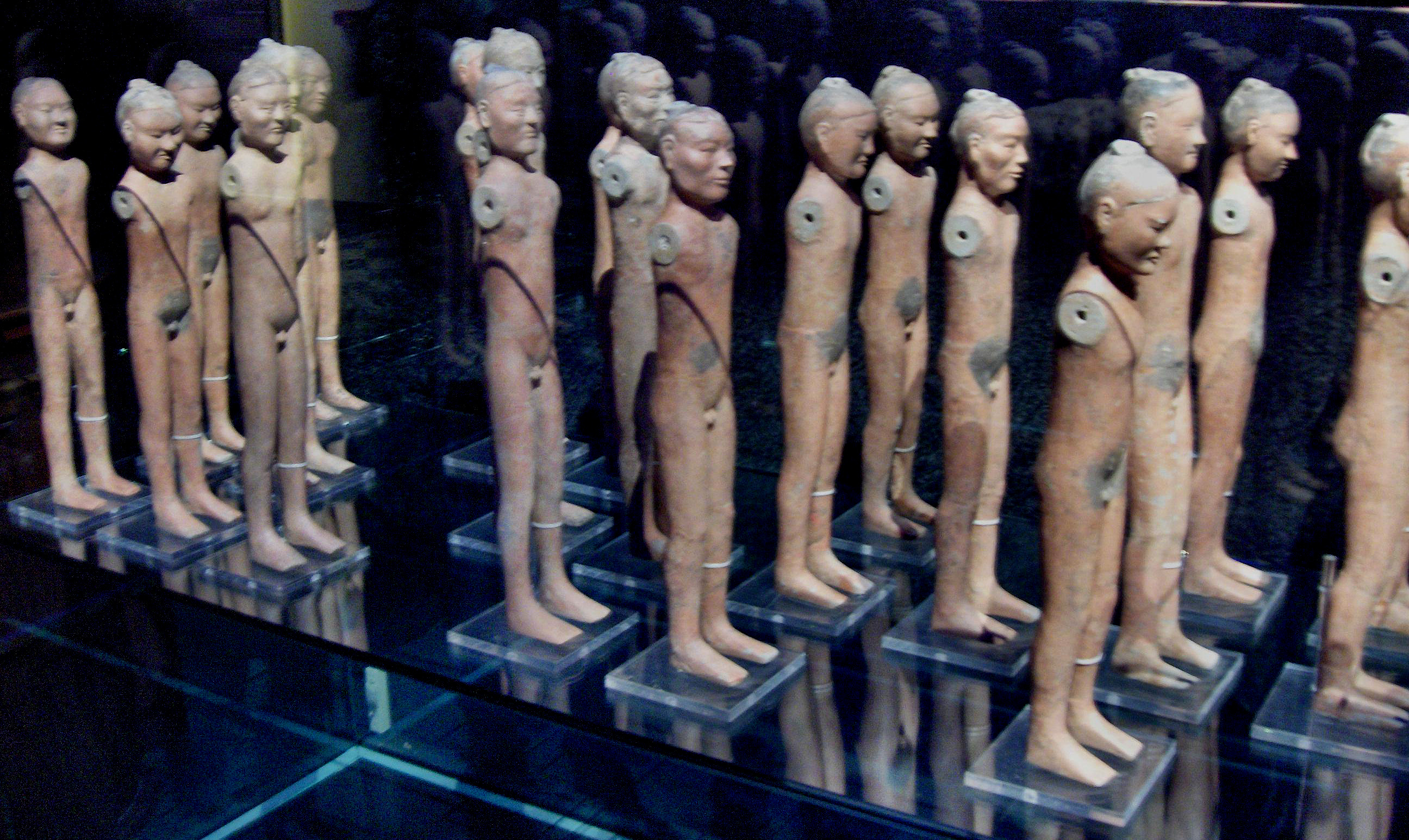
Western-Han unclothed pottery servants that once had wooden arms and miniature silk clothes, yet these have eroded and disappeared.

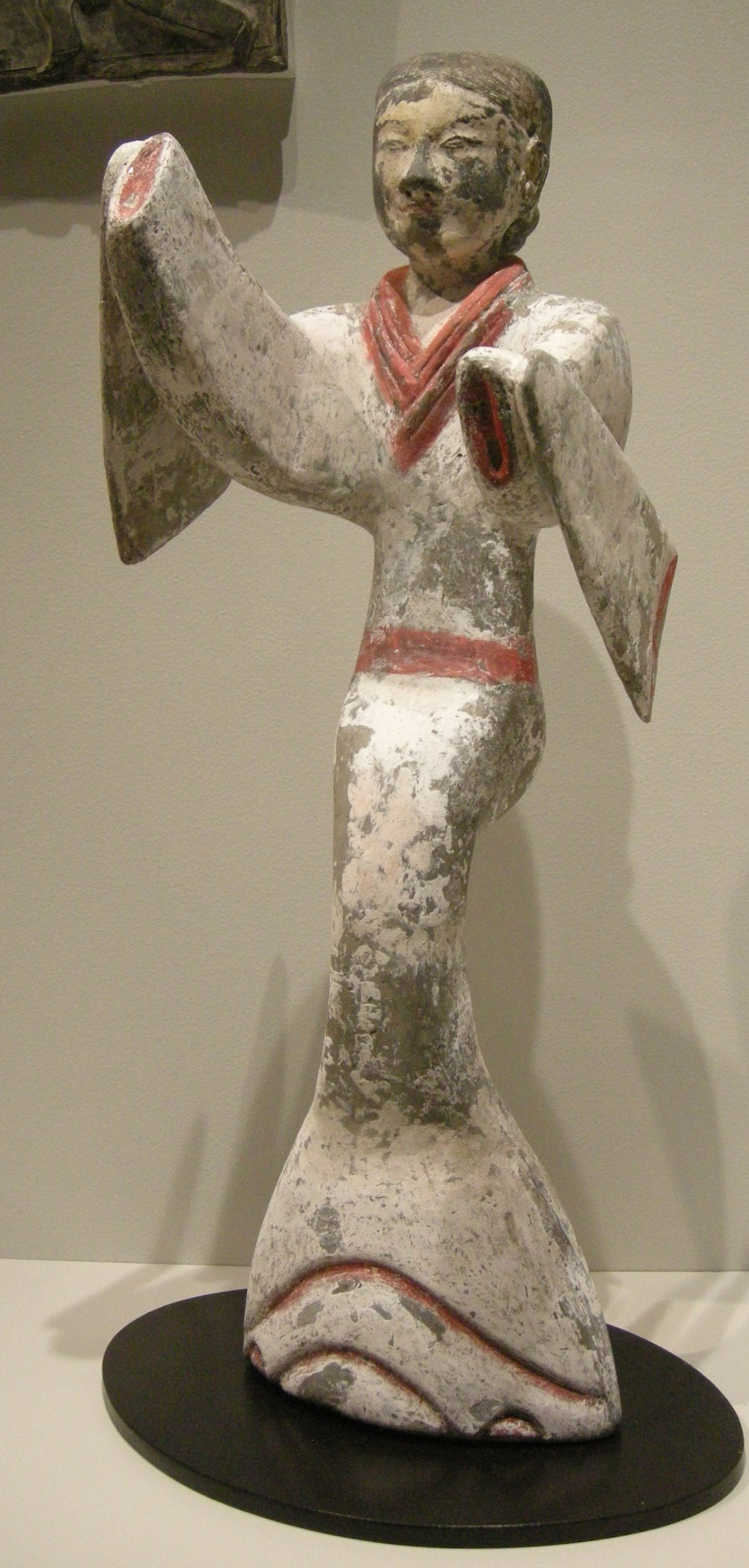
Han painted pottery figurine of a woman dancer waving silk sleeves.

Artists were classified as artisans since they were nonagricultural laborers who manufactured and decorated objects. The philosopher Wang Fu argued that urban society exploited the contributions of food-producing farmers while able-bodied men in the cities wasted their time (among other listed pursuits) crafting miniature plaster carts, earthenware statues of dogs, horses, and human figures of singers and actors, and children's toys. However, during Eastern Han some scholar-officials began engaging in crafts originally reserved for artisans, such as mechanical engineering. Emperor Ling commissioned the official Cai Yong (132–192 CE) to paint portraits and produce eulogies for five generations of the prominent Yang clan of officials and military officers. This is the first recorded instance in China where a scholar-official was commissioned to write eulogies and paint portraits in conjunction, instead of relying on skilled artisans to do the painting.

Han luxury items furnished the homes of wealthy merchants, officials, nobles, and royalty. Such goods were often highly decorated by skilled artisans. These include red-and-black lacquerwares in various shapes and sizes, bronze items such as raised-relief decorated mirrors, oil lamps in the shape of human figures, and gilded bronzewares, glazed ceramic wares with various incised designs, and ornaments and jewelry made of jade, opal, amber, quartz, gold, and silver.

Besides domestic decoration, Han artwork also served an important funerary function. Han artists and craftsmen decorated the wall bricks lining underground tombs of the deceased with mural paintings and carved reliefs; the purpose of this artwork was to aid the deceased in traveling through their afterlife journey. Stamping artistic designs into tile and brick was also common. Human figurine sculptures found in Han tombs were placed there to perform various functions for the deceased in the afterlife, such as dancing and playing music for entertainment, as well as serving food. A common type of ceramic figurine found in Han tombs is a female entertainer sporting long, flowing silk sleeves that are flung about while dancing. Some ceramic human figures—both male and female—have been found naked, all with clearly distinguished genitalia and missing arms. This is because they once had wooden or cloth arms which were attached to holes in the shoulders by pegs, as well as miniature clothes made of perishable materials such as silk.

During the Western Han, grave goods were usually wares and pieces of art that were used by the tomb occupant when he or she was alive. By the Eastern Han, new stylistic goods, wares, and artwork found in tombs were usually made exclusively for burial and were not produced for previous use by the deceased when they were alive. These include miniature ceramic towers—usually watchtowers and urban residential towers—which provide historians clues about lost wooden architecture. In addition to towers, there are also miniature models of querns, water wells, pigsties, pestling shops, and farm fields with pottery pigs, dogs, sheep, chickens, ducks. Although many items placed in tombs were commonly used wares and utensils, it was considered taboo to bring objects specified for burial into living quarters or the imperial palace. They could only be brought into living quarters once they were properly announced at funerary ceremonies, and were known as mingqi (明器/冥器) ("fearsome artifacts," "objects for the dead," or "brilliant artifacts").

== Clothing and cuisine ==
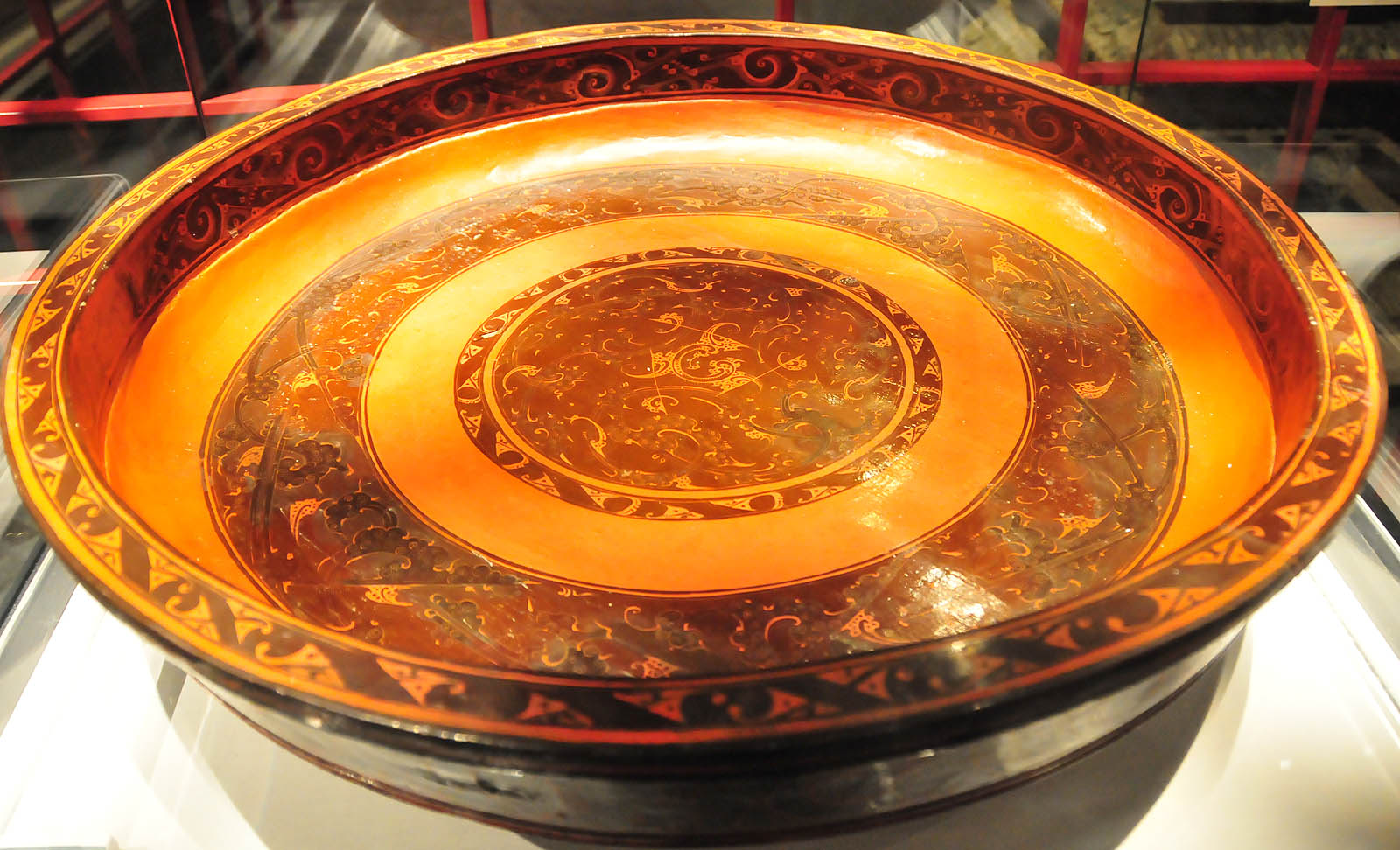
A Han red-and-black lacquerware tray; lacquerwares were common luxury items that adorned the dining tables of the rich and wealthy

The most common agricultural food staples during the Han were wheat, barley, rice, foxtail millet, proso millet, and beans. People of the Han also consumed sorghum, Job's tears, taro, mallow, mustard green, melon, bottle gourd, bamboo shoot, the roots of lotus plants, and ginger. Some of the fruits the Han ate included the chestnut, jujube, pear, peach, plum (including the plum of Prunus salicina and Prunus mume), melon, apricot, red bayberry, and strawberry. The Han Chinese domesticated and ate chickens, Mandarin ducks, geese, camels, cows, sheep, pigs, and dogs. The type of game animals hunted during the Han included rabbit, sika deer, turtle dove, goose, owl, Chinese bamboo partridge, magpie, common pheasant, and cranes, while fish and turtles were taken from streams and lakes. Beer—which could be an unfermented malt drink with low alcohol content or a stronger brew fermented with yeast—was commonly consumed alongside meat, but virtually never consumed alongside grains such as rice. Wine was also regularly consumed.

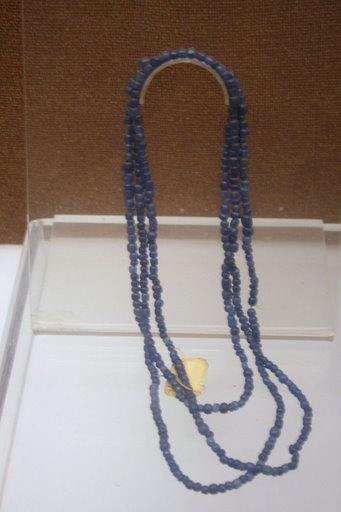
An Eastern-Han necklace made of blue glass beads

The 2nd-century-BCE tomb of the Lady Dai contained not only decayed remnants of actual food, such as rice, wheat, barley, two varieties of millet, and soybeans, but also a grave inventory with recipes on it. This included vegetable and meat stews cooked in pots, which had combinations such as beef and rice stew, dog meat and celery stew, and even deer, fish, and bamboo shoot stew. Seasonings mentioned in the recipes include sugar, honey, soy sauce, and salt. Recipes in the Han usually called for meat stuffed in cereals, cakes, and other wrappings.

Like their modern counterparts, the Han-era Chinese used chopsticks as eating utensils. For drinking beverages, wealthy people during Han often used cups with golden handles and inlaid with silver.

For the poor, hemp was the common item used to make clothing, while the rich could afford silk clothes. Silk clothes found in Han tombs include padded robes, double-layered robes, single-layered robes, single-layered skirts, shoes, socks, and mittens. The wealthy also wore fox and badger furs, wild duck plumes, and slippers with inlaid leather or silk lining; those of more modest means could wear wool and ferret skins. Large bamboo-matted suitcases found in Han tombs contained clothes and luxury items such as patterned fabric and embroidery, common silk, damask and brocade, and the leno (or gauze) weave, all with rich colors and designs. The Han also had tools for ironing clothes.

== Religion, cosmology, and metaphysics ==
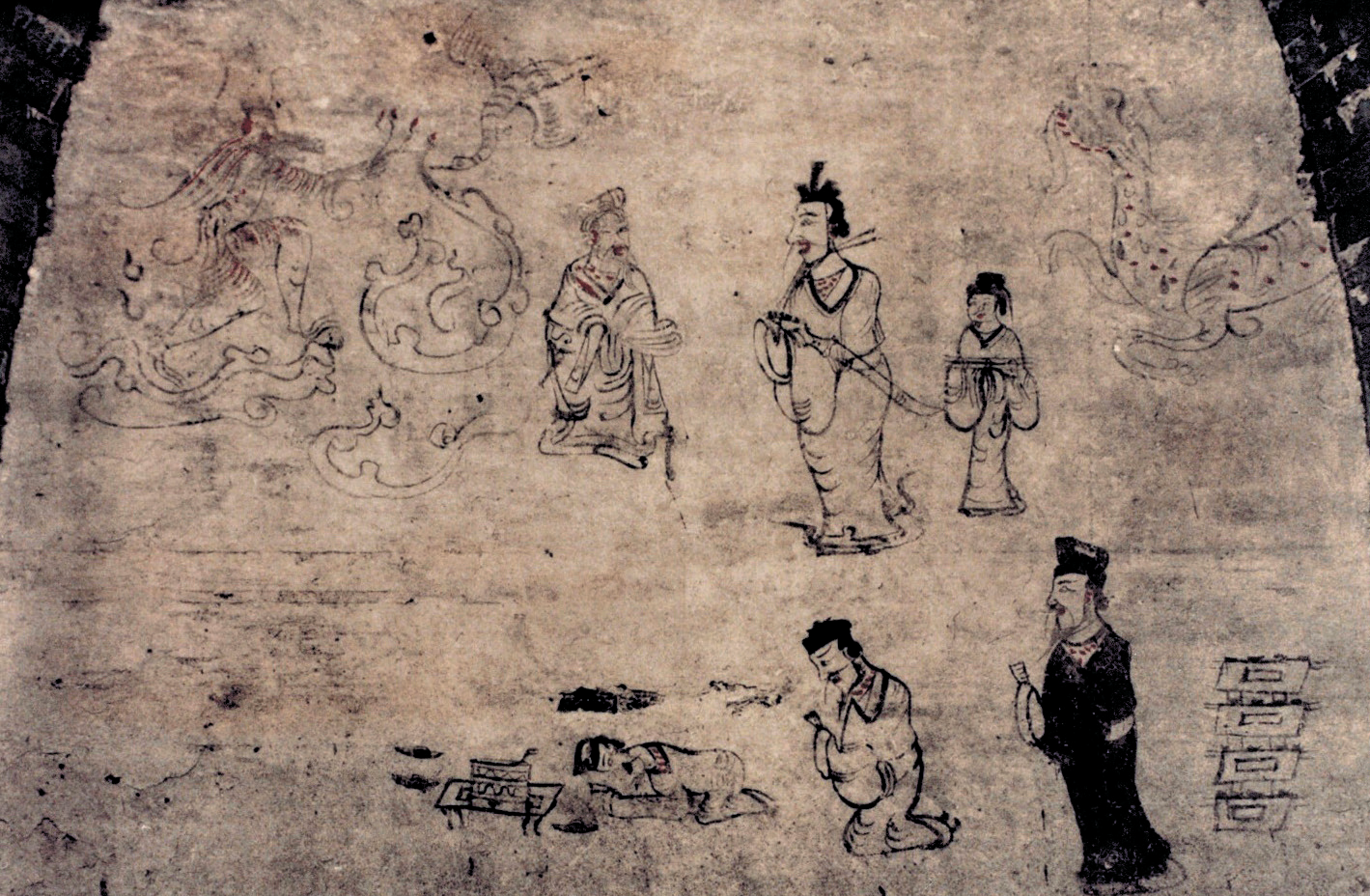
Eastern Han mural of scholar-official paying respects to heavenly beings.

=== Ancestor worship, deities, and the afterlife ===
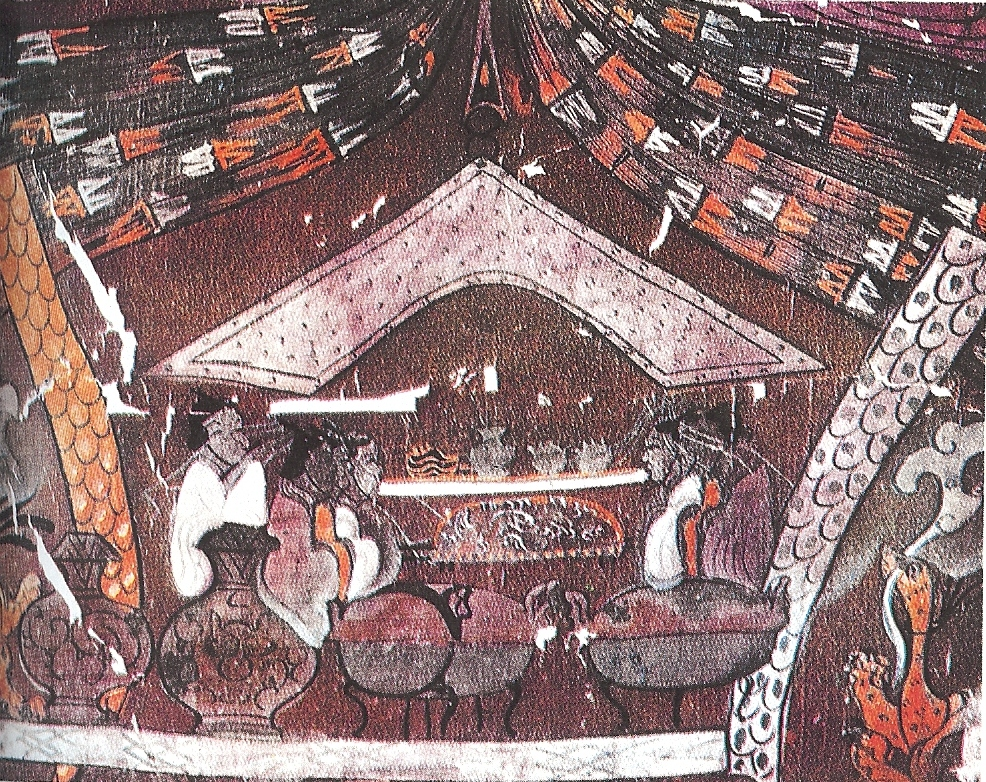
A close-up view of a larger silk banner with a painted design of a sacrificial offering to the deceased, excavated from the Mawangdui in Changsha, Hunan province, dated 2nd century BCE

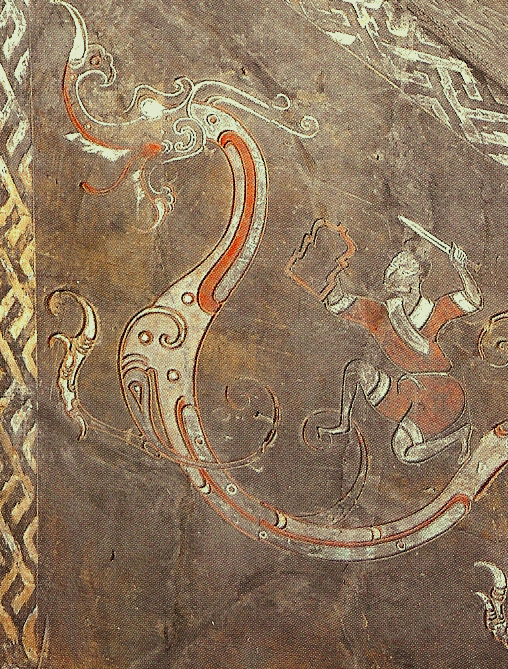
A Western-Han painted tomb tile showing an armed warrior riding a dragon, one of many creatures in Chinese mythology

Families throughout Han China made ritual sacrifices (usually involving animals and foodstuffs) to various deities, spirits, and ancestors. Deceased ancestors were thought to require food and drink in the afterlife, so living family members were routinely obligated to offer food and wine to the ancestors in a family shrine or temple. Wealthy families who could afford to bury their dead in large tombs often placed the food items at the entrances of such complexes.

Han-era Chinese believed that a person had two souls, the hun and po. The spirit-soul (hun 魂) was believed to travel to the paradise of the immortals (xian 仙) while the body-soul (po 魄) remained on earth in its proper resting place so long as measures were taken to prevent it from wandering to the netherworld. The body-soul could allegedly utilize items placed in the tomb of the deceased, such as domestic wares, clothes, food and utensils, and even money in the form of clay replicas. It was believed that the bipartite souls could also be temporarily reunited in a ceremony called "summoning the hun to return to the po" (zhao hun fu po 招魂復魄).

However, Han beliefs in the afterlife were not uniform across the empire and changed over time. Not only were there many different burial customs and views on how one journeyed through the afterlife, but even the names hun and po for spirit-soul and body-soul could be substituted with demon (gui 鬼) and spirit (shen 神). Demons, or gui, were thought to be partial manifestations of the deceased which lacked their essential vital energy (qi 氣) that had to be exorcised when they maliciously caused the living to become ill; however, a demon could also be considered a neutral 'ghost'. Spirits, or shen, were usually associated with the animalistic spirits embodying certain places, such as the Earl of the Yellow River (He Bo 河伯). If proper sacrifices were made to these spirits, it was believed to bring good fortune; if ritual sacrifices were neglected, the spirit could inflict bad fortune on individuals and local communities. In the Western Han, texts left behind in tombs illustrate that the living took a more sympathetic view towards the dead than in the Eastern Han, when spirits were generally more feared as dangers to the living. The Western Han 'letters informing the underground' (gaodishu 告地書) were written to 'inform the Ruler of the Underground' 告地下王 about the deceased's wants and needs for clothing, vessels, and implements. However, 'tomb-quelling texts' (zhenmuwen 鎮墓文) that appeared during the 1st century CE acted as passports for the dead so that they did not disturb or bring danger to the living. Both Western Han and Eastern Han tombs contained 'land contracts' (diquan 地券) which stated that the deceased owned the land they were buried in.

Since the emperor fulfilled the role of the highest priest in the land, he was obligated to offer ritual sacrifices to Heaven, the supreme deities, and spirits of the mountains and rivers. The Qin court had made sacrifices to and worshipped four main deities, to which Emperor Gaozu added one in 205 BCE to make Five Powers (Wudi 五帝). However, Emperor Cheng (r. 33–7 BCE) cancelled state worship of the Five Powers in favor of ceremonies dedicated to Heaven (Tian 天) and the supreme god (Shangdi 上帝), who the kings of the Zhou dynasty (c. 1050 – 256 BCE) had worshipped and traced their legitimacy to. One of the underlying reasons for this shift in state policy was Emperor Cheng's desire to gain Heaven's direct favor and thus become blessed with a male heir. The court's exclusive worship of Heaven continued throughout the rest of Han.

=== Yin-yang and five phases ===
The Han Chinese believed that three realms of Heaven, Earth, and Mankind were inextricably linked and subject to natural cycles; if man could understand these cycles, they could understand the hidden secrets of the three realms. One cycle was yin and yang, which corresponded to yielding and hard, shade and sunlight, feminine and masculine, and the Moon and Sun, respectively, while it was thought to govern the three realms and changing of seasons. The five phases was another important cycle where the elements of wood (mu 木), fire (huo 火), earth (tu 土), metal (jin 金), and water (shui 水) succeeded each other in rotation and each corresponded with certain traits of the three realms. For example, the five phases corresponded with other sets of five like the five organs (i.e. liver, heart, spleen, lungs and kidneys) and five tastes (i.e. sour, bitter, sweet, spicy, and salty), or even things like feelings, musical notes, colors, planets, calendars and time periods.

The Interactions of Wu Xing: The creation cycle (black, circle shaped arrows) and the overcoming cycle (white, star shaped arrows).

It was accepted during the Qin dynasty that whoever defeated his rivals in battle would have legitimacy to rule the land. Yet by the time of Wang Mang's usurpation it was commonly believed that Heaven, which was now given greater prominence in state worship, designated which individual and hereditary house had the right to rule, a concept known as the Mandate of Heaven. Michael Loewe (retired professor from the University of Cambridge) writes that this is consistent with the gradually higher level of emphasis given to the cosmic elements of Five Phases, which were linked with the future destiny of the dynasty and its protection. Dong Zhongshu stressed that a ruler who behaved immorally and did not adhere to proper conduct created a disruption in the natural cycles governing the three realms, which resulted in natural calamities such as earthquakes, floods, droughts, epidemics, and swarms of locusts. This idea became fully accepted at court (and in later dynasties), as emperors often implemented reforms to the legal system or granted amnesties to restore nature's balance.

At the beginning of the Han dynasty, the Liu family associated its dynasty with the water phase as the previous Qin dynasty had done. By 104 BCE, to accompany the installment of the new Taichu Calendar (太初历), the Han court aligned itself with the earth phase to legitimately supplant the Qin's element. Yet by 26 CE (shortly after the downfall of Wang Mang) the new Eastern Han court made a retrospective argument that Han's element had always been fire.

=== Daoism and Buddhism ===
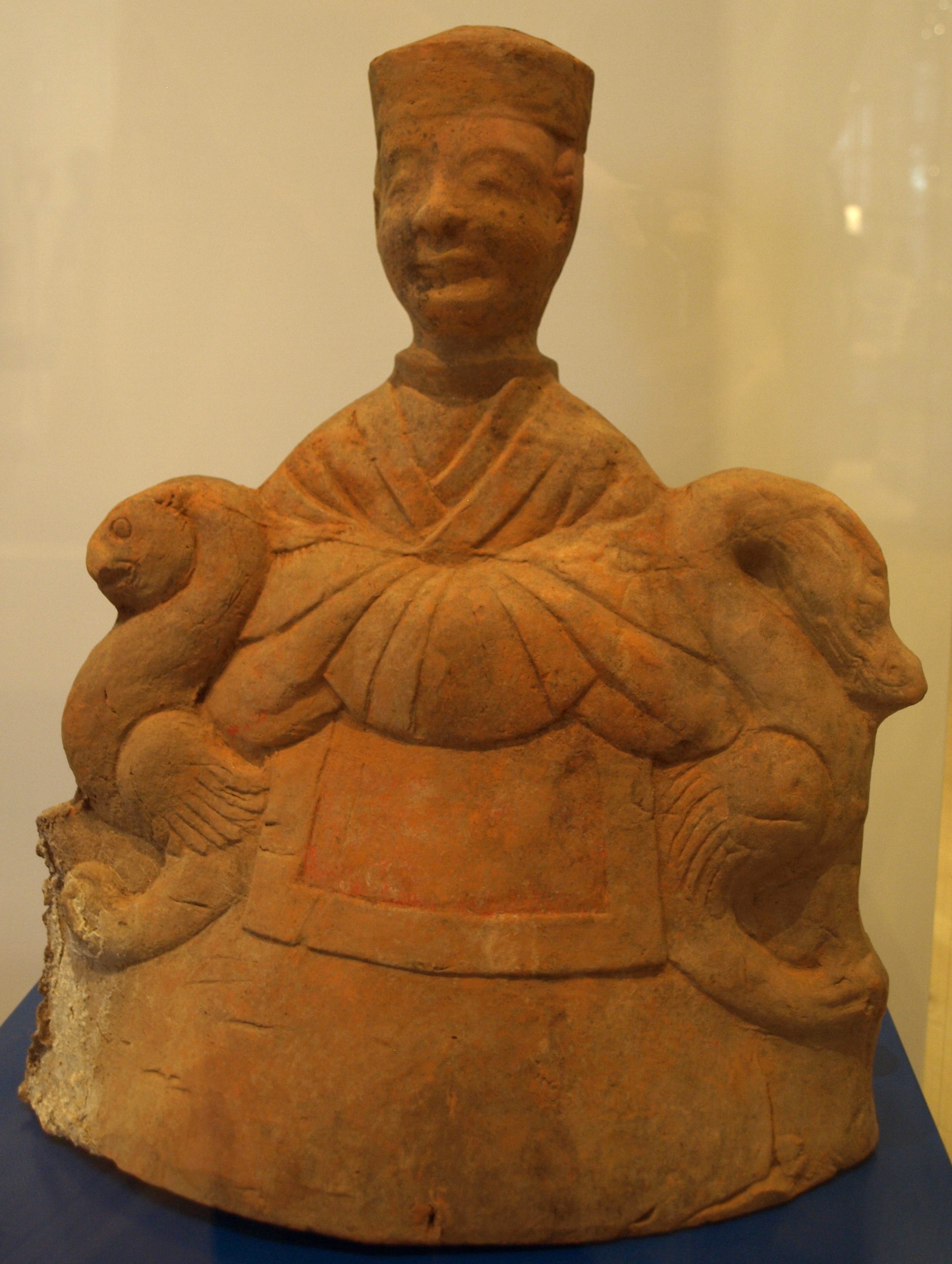
Earthenware figurine depicting the Queen Mother of the West, 2nd century CE, Eastern Han period

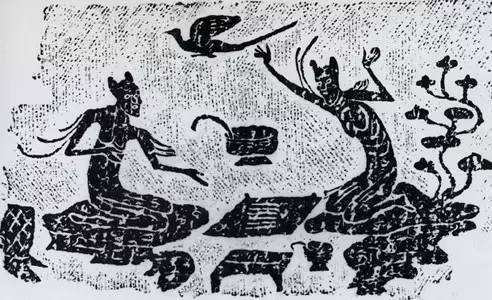
Han dynasty relief of Winged Immortals playing Liubo.

After Huang-Lao thought became eclipsed by other ideologies explaining the cosmos during the 2nd century BCE, the sage philosopher Laozi replaced the Yellow Emperor as the ancestor and originator of the teachings of Daoism. As written by Wang Chong in the 1st century CE, Daoists were chiefly concerned with obtaining immortality. Valerie Hansen writes that Han-era Daoists were organized into small groups of people who believed that individual immortality could be obtained through "breathing exercises, sexual techniques, and medical potions." However, these were the same practices of Daoists who followed Zhuangzi (fl. 4th century BCE) centuries before. The Han-era Chinese believed that the Queen Mother of the West ruled over a mountainous realm of immortal semi-human creatures who possessed elixirs of immortality that man could utilize to prolong his life. Besides the Queen Mother's mountain to the west, Mount Penglai in the east was another mythological location where the Han-era Chinese believed one could achieve immortality. Wang Chong stated that Daoists, organized into small groups of hermits largely unconcerned with the wider laity, believed they could attempt to fly to the lands of the immortals and become invincible pure men. His criticism of such groups is the best known source of his century to describe Daoist beliefs. However, a major transformation in Daoist beliefs occurred in the 2nd century CE, when large hierarchical religious societies formed and viewed Laozi as a deity and prophet who would usher in salvation for his followers.

The first mentioning of Buddhism in China occurred in 65 CE. This was in regards to Liu Ying (d. 71 CE), a half-brother of Emperor Ming, who allegedly paid homage to the Buddha. At this point, the Chinese heavily associated Buddhism with Huang-Lao Daoism. Emperor Ming also had the first known Buddhist temple constructed in China, the White Horse Temple of Luoyang. It was allegedly built in honor of the foreign monks Jiashemoteng (迦葉摩騰) (Kāśyapa Mātanga) and Zhu Falan (竺法蘭) (Dharmaratna the Indian). A popular myth asserted that these two monks were the first to translate the Sutra of Forty-two Chapters into Chinese, although it is now known that this work was not translated into Chinese until the 2nd century CE. The Parthian monk An Shigao from the Parthian Empire came to Han China in 148 CE. He translated Buddhist works on the Hinayana into Chinese, as well as works on yoga that Han-era Chinese associated with Daoist exercises. Another foreign monk, Lokaksema from Kushan-era Gandhara, India, traveled and stayed in Han China from around 178–198 CE. He translated the Perfection of Wisdom, Shurangama Sutra, and Pratyutpanna Sutra, and introduced to China the concepts of Akshobhya Buddha, Amitābha Buddha (of Pure Land Buddhism), and teachings about Manjusri.

=== Religious societies and rebel movements ===
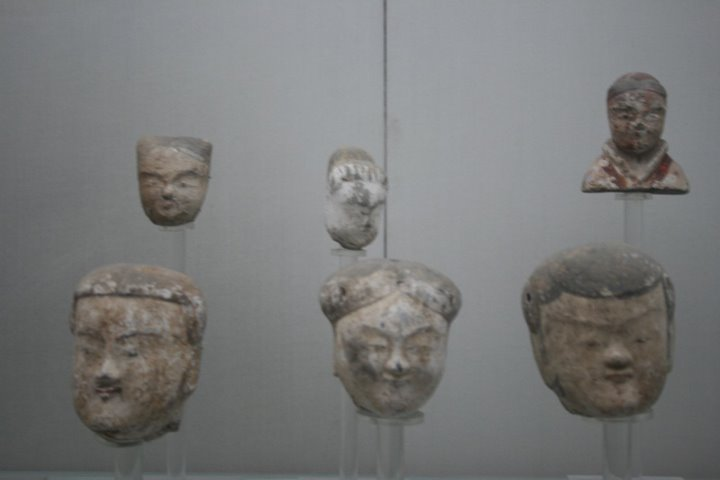
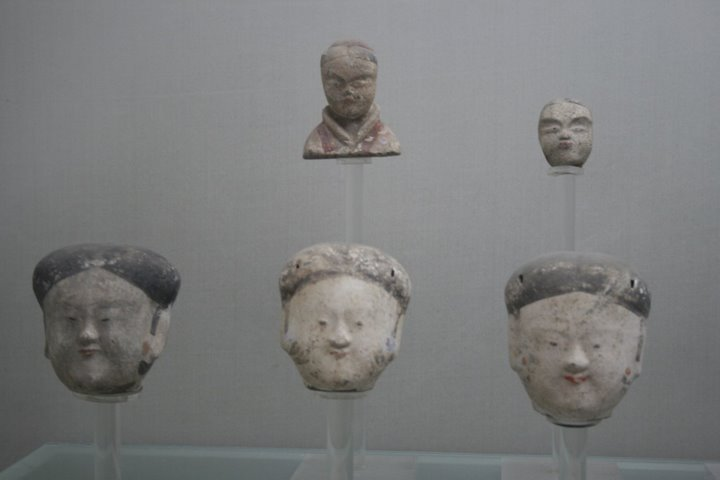
Han-dynasty ceramic pottery heads, broken off from their original bodies that once formed statuettes

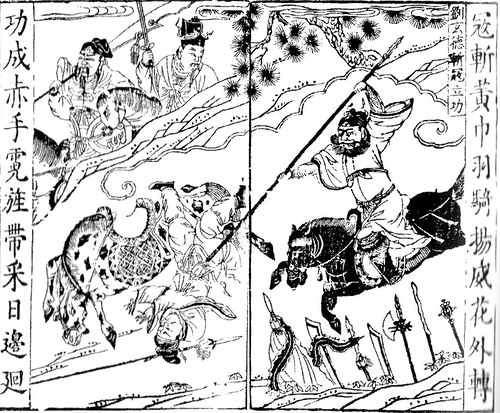
A Qing dynasty illustration of Liu Bei, Guan Yu, and Zhang Fei during the 184 CE Yellow Turban Rebellion

The Daoist religious society of the Five Pecks of Rice was initiated by Zhang Daoling in 142 CE. Zhang was raised in what is now Jiangsu where he studied Daoist beliefs in immortality. He moved to what is now Sichuan province and claimed to have a revelation where the deified Laozi appointed him as his earthly representative and Celestial Master. The movement spread rapidly, particularly under Zhang's sons, Zhang Heng and Zhang Lu. Instead of money, followers were asked to contribute five pecks of rice to the religious society and banned the worship of 'unclean' gods who accepted sacrificial offerings of meat. Initiated members of the group were called 'libationers', a title associated with village elders who took the first drink at feasts. The laity were told that if they obeyed the rules of the religious society, they would be rewarded with good health. Illness was thus seen as the result of violating religious rules and committing personal sins, which required confession to libationers charged with overseeing the recovery of sinners. They believed that chanting parts of the Daodejing would bring about cures for illnesses. Zhang Daoling's second successor Zhang Lu initiated a rebellion in 184 CE that allowed him to retain complete control over Ba and Hanzhong commanderies (of modern Sichuan and southern Shanxi) for three decades. He even modelled his 'charity houses' after Han postal stations, yet his establishments offered grain and meat to followers. Although Zhang Lu surrendered to Chancellor Cao Cao (155–220 CE) in 215 CE, Cao was still wary of his influence over the people, so he granted Zhang and his sons fiefs to placate them.

The widespread Yellow Turban Rebellion also occurred in 184 CE, its leaders claiming that they were destined to bring about a utopian era of peace. Like the Five Pecks of Rice society, the Yellow Turbans of the Huai and Yellow River valleys also believed that illness was a sign of wrongdoing that necessitated confession to church leaders and faith healers. However, the Yellow Turbans typically utilized holy water as a ramification for sickness; if this did not cure the sick, the latter's sins were deemed too great to be exculpated. Since the year 184 CE was the first (and very auspicious) year of a new sexagenary cycle, the Yellow Turban's supreme leader Zhang Jue (d. 184 CE) chose the third month of that year as the time to rebel; when this was leaked to the Han court, Zhang was forced to initiate the rebellion prematurely. Although the Yellow Turbans were able to muster hundreds of thousands of troops, they were overpowered by the combined force of imperial troops and independent generals. By the end of the year their leadership—including Zhang Jue—had been killed and only scattered groups remained until they were amalgamated into the forces of Cao Cao in 192 CE.

== See also ==
- Economy of the Han dynasty
- Han dynasty tomb architecture
- List of emperors of the Han dynasty
- Western Han dynasty imperial tombs
