= Buddhist Chinese =

Form of written Chinese used in Chinese Buddhist Literature

- Buddhist Hybrid Chinese
- Region: The Sinosphere: China; Japan; Taiwan; Korea; Vietnam
- Language family: Sino-Tibetan: Sinitic; Chinese; Buddhist Chinese

Language codes
- ISO 639-3: –
- Glottolog: None

Chinese name
- Traditional Chinese: 佛教漢語
- Simplified Chinese: 佛教汉语
Transcriptions
Standard Mandarin
- Hanyu Pinyin: Fójiào Hànyǔ
- Wade–Giles: Fo2chiao4 Han4yü3

Buddhist Chinese (simplified Chinese: 佛教汉语; traditional Chinese: 佛教漢語; pinyin: Fójiào Hànyǔ) is a specialized written form of Ancient Literary Chinese that is the main literary language of East Asian Buddhism and the Chinese Buddhist Canon. As such it is also called the "language of the Buddhist classics" (Chinese: 佛典語言; pinyin: Fódiǎn Yǔyán), as well as "Buddhist Hybrid Chinese".

Throughout the pre-modern history of Buddhism in East Asia, Buddhist Chinese served as the main written lingua franca for educated Buddhists in China, Japan, Vietnam and Korea. Buddhist Chinese developed from the extensive historical efforts to translate Indic Buddhist texts into Chinese. This unique register of Literary Chinese is a significantly different from Classical Chinese and modern Literary Chinese, with a unique vocabulary influenced by Indian terms and vernacular Chinese, as well as unique grammatical features and styles. Unique features include numerous compound terms which serve as translations for Buddhist terms, and Chinese transliterations of words from Indian languages (mainly Sanskrit, and Prakrits like Gandhari).

The most active period of direct translation of Buddhist Chinese texts was the period from the end of the Han dynasty (202 BCE–220 CE) to the Song dynasty (960–1279 CE). During this period many important original Chinese Buddhist texts were also composed in China that became part of the Chinese Buddhist Canon. These original compositions include the foundational works of the main schools of Chinese Buddhism, such as the Platform Sutra (for Chan/Zen), the works of Zhiyi (Tiantai), Fazang (Huayan), and Shandao (Pure Land). They also include other genres, such as biographies, travel literature, Zen sayings (語錄; yǔlù), popular narratives (變文; biànwén) and vernacular poetry (白話詩; báihuàshī). Modern scholars sometimes make a further distinction between "original" Buddhist Chinese, which refers mainly to canonical translations of Indic works, and "evolved" Buddhist Chinese, which refers to the written Buddhist Chinese found in the Buddhist literature composed in China.

Buddhist Chinese had an impact on the development of secular Chinese literature as well as influencing the development of modern Chinese vocabulary and syntax. As such, Buddhist Chinese had an impact on the development of Chinese language as a whole. Contemporary Mandarin's abstract vocabulary include many words coined in Buddhist Chinese translation, including words for consciousness and psychological states, time, and cosmology. Examples include yìshí (意识; "consciousness"), shìjiè (世界; "world, Earth") and tǎ (塔; "tower, pagoda, stupa").

== History ==
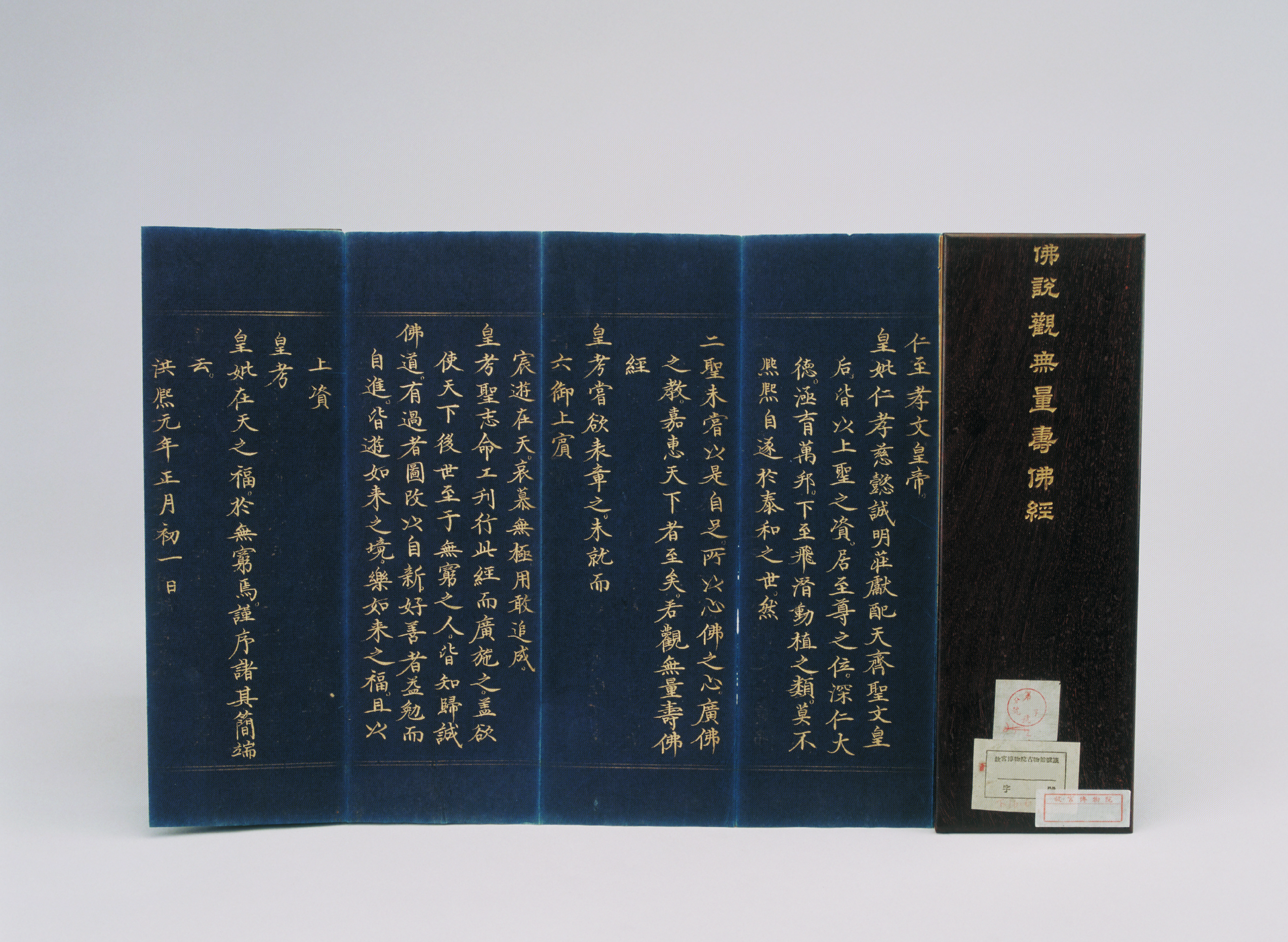
A part of a Qing dynasty copy of the Amitāyus Contemplation Sūtra (Chinese: 佛說觀無量壽佛經; pinyin: Fóshuō guānwúliàng shòu fó jīng)

Buddhism began to arrive in China along the Silk Road and the Maritime Silk Road sometime during the Eastern Han dynasty (25–220 CE). The process of the transmission of Buddhism immediately turned to translation of Indic and Central Asian source texts.

The majority of translators of Buddhist texts into Chinese were foreign monks from India or Central Asia, like the Parthian An Shigao, and the Kucheans Lokakṣema (fl. 147–189 CE) and Kumārajīva (343– 413 CE). Some later figures were also native Chinese who traveled to India and studied Sanskrit texts there, like Faxian (c. 337–422 CE) and Xuanzang (602–664 CE). Most translators who produced significant translations did not work alone however, making use of teams of translators and scribes. Thus, even though most translators were not native Chinese speakers, they worked as part of translation teams which included native speakers and learned literati who edited and polished the translations.

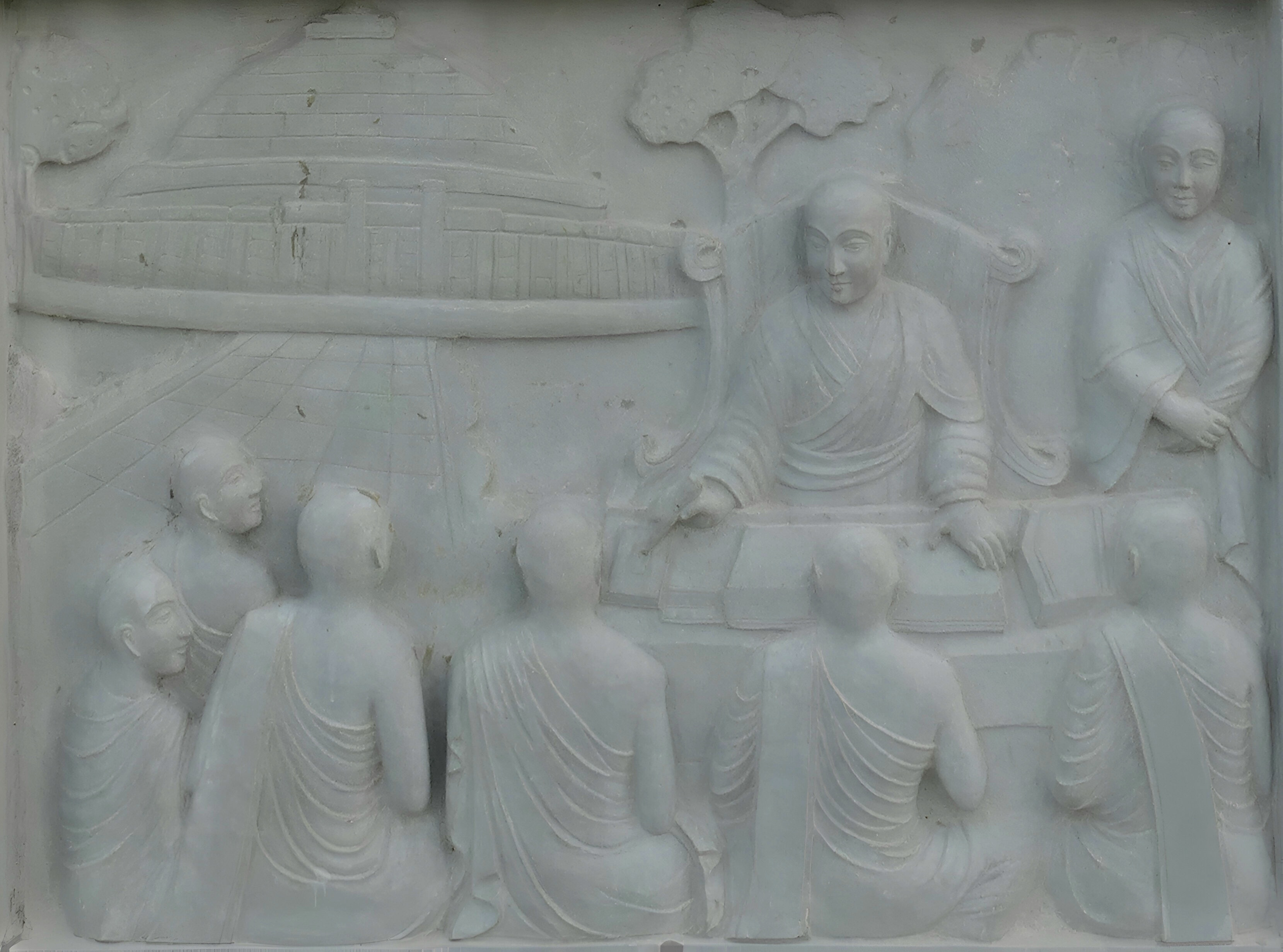
Xuanzang studying in India

As explained in Graham & Linebarger:

For example, a translation of the Madhyama Agama or ‘Middle-Length Collection of Sutras’ (中阿含; zhōng āhán) made during the Eastern Jin (317– 420) is attributed to Sanghadeva from Kashmir. An account of the translation process by one of the participants, a monk called Dàocí (道慈), says that it was produced by a team of two Indian monks and three Chinese Buddhists. One Indian monk read out the text from a manuscript, Sanghadeva translated it orally into Chinese, Daoci wrote it down and the two others prepared the final version.

As such, the texts of the Chinese canon were translated by many different figures from different source texts (in different Indic and Iranian languages). This process happened over around 1,100 years and thus the various texts of the Chinese canon reflect different genres and translation styles and philosophies. A Yuan dynasty catalogue lists 194 known translators who worked on about 1,440 texts in 5,580 fascicles (juans).

According to Zhu, this multi-generational project of translation "represents one of the most significant examples of language contact in the history of mankind, juxtaposing some structurally very different Indo-European languages and varieties of Chinese." Before the development of Buddhist Chinese, contact between India and China was minimal. The advent of this literary language enabled significant cultural contact that had a profound and lasting effect on Chinese culture, popular or colloquial Chinese and popular Chinese literature. By the Tang Dynasty, Buddhist Chinese had emerged as a respectable literary language that stood side by side Classical Chinese.

The modern Chinese thinker Hu Shih described the process by which Buddhism influenced Chinese culture as "Indianisation", which he compares to the Christianization of Europe in the extent of its impact. Hu Shih argued that this process occurred over four main phases: 1. the phase of mass borrowing and mass translation; 2. resistance and persecution which Buddhists responded to in various ways; 3. domestication, which saw Buddhism sinicized and transformed into a Chinese religion as Chinese Buddhists felt confident to compose their own original works and express original ideas; and 4. appropriation of Chinese Buddhism into other Chinese sub-cultures and literatures".

Modern scholars also distinguish between three main periods of translation:

- Ancient translation (Guyi 古譯, c. Han dynasty to Western Jin): Includes vernacular influenced translations by An Shigao and Lokakṣema, the more formal written register translations of Kang Mengxiang (康孟詳) and Kang Senghui, and the translations of Zhi Qian and Dharmarakṣa which contain elements of both vernacular and literary Chinese.
- Old translation (Jiuyi 舊譯, Late Qin Kingdom c. 384–417): A form exemplified by the works of Kumārajīva (344-413) and those who follow his mature style which hybridizes vernacular Chinese with formal written Chinese and contained a mature vocabulary of translated and transliterated Buddhist terms. Kumārajīva's style was free and liberal, as he held that translations should follow the characteristics of the Chinese language first as long as it also retains the meaning of the source text. He thus emphasized comprehensibility (達; dá), elegant writing and fluency rather than literalness.
- New translation (Xinyi 新譯, Tang dynasty and Northern Song): A highly technical register which was promoted by figures like Xuanzang (602–664), his students and later translators like Dānapāla. Xuanzang emphasized the quality of faithfulness (信; xìn) to the Indian source texts. To remain as close as possible to the original, Xuanzang developed a set of standard translations for terms, expressions and even whole sentences. As such, Xuanzang's translation is highly technical and stylized, appearing abstract and artificial in comparison to the more natural translations of Kumārajīva.

Buddhist Chinese also influenced the development of new literary genres, including the Chinese novel, which is particularly prominent in Wu Cheng’en’s (c. 1500–1582) Journey to the West, sinitic Buddhist genres like the Zen koan and travelogues like The Great Tang Records on the Western Regions which chronicles Xuanzang’s pilgrimage. The rise of the Chan school saw a return to popular vernacular and natural language, perhaps as a reaction to the technical and abstruse Buddhist Chinese of Xuanzang. This can be seen in the genre of the Yǔlù (語錄), the recorded sayings of the Chan masters.

Buddhist Chinese writings in turn influenced other genres of Chinese literature unrelated to Buddhism. For example, the genre of "recorded dialogue" (語錄; yǔlù) which developed in Chan Buddhism influenced similar texts on the sayings of influential Neo-Confucian scholars. Buddhist Chinese language also influenced the literati, as can be seen in the poetry of Tao Yangming who uses numerous Buddhist Chinese terms even though he was not a Buddhist per se. Various scriptures of the Daoist Canon, especially the Lingbao scriptures, also show significant influence and borrowing from Buddhist Chinese scriptures.

The most important impact of Buddhist Chinese on broader Chinese language was that it influenced the revolutionary development of báihuà (白話), Written vernacular Chinese. Buddhist Chinese influenced the development of secular vernacular Chinese literature.

As is now well known, numerous words entered vernacular and literary Chinese from Buddhist Chinese. These loanwords include common religious terms like púsà (菩薩) for ‘bodhisattva’ as well as words that are now used without specific religious connotations, such as fāngbiàn (方便; "convenient") from the translation for upaya, fánnǎo (煩惱; "to be vexed, worried, irritated"), originally the translation for kleśa and bùkěsīyì (不可思議; "inconceivable"), from the translation for acintya.

== Linguistic features ==
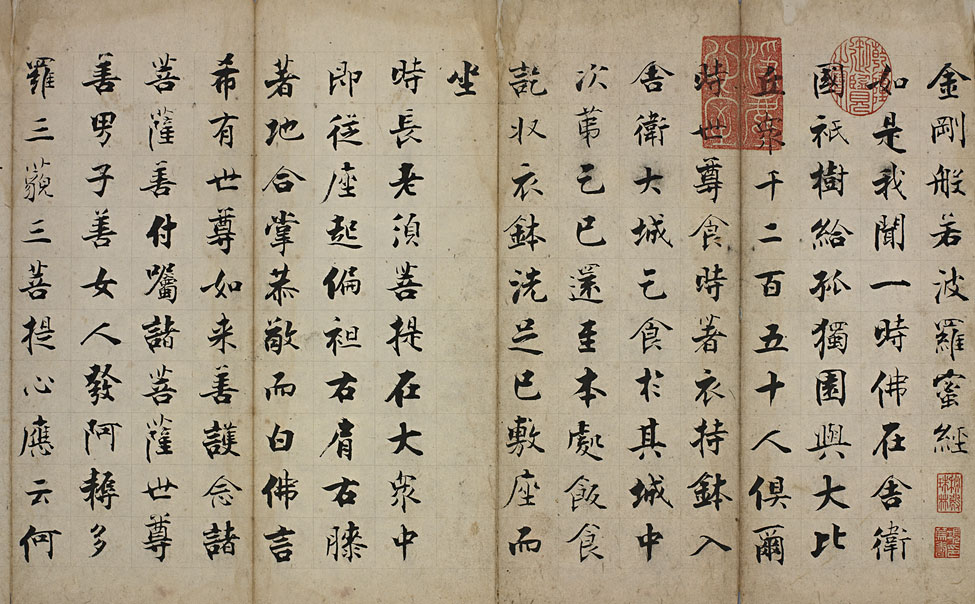
The Chinese calligrapher Zhang Jizhi (1186–1266) made this handwritten edition of the Diamond Sutra in 1253. Sutra copying, a practice for which Zhang Jizhi was well-known, was considered an act of accumulating merit.

Buddhist Chinese is unique due to its hybrid character, which consists of two main types of hybridization:

- A blending of Chinese and non-Chinese language elements from Sanskrit, Prakrits and Iranian Languages like Khotanese
- A hybridization of classical written Chinese (文言文; wényánwén; "literary Chinese") and colloquial Chinese (白話文; báihuàwén)

=== Non-Sinitic elements ===
The Buddhist texts translated into Chinese from non-Chinese languages include a large amount of elements that were created during the process of translation. These elements include a large number of phonological transcriptions, transliterations and calques. These texts also included new rules for creating compounds and phrases unknown in Classical Chinese. These influenced the development of numerous disyllabic words, and four-character idioms, which are now common in modern Chinese.

==== Vocabulary ====
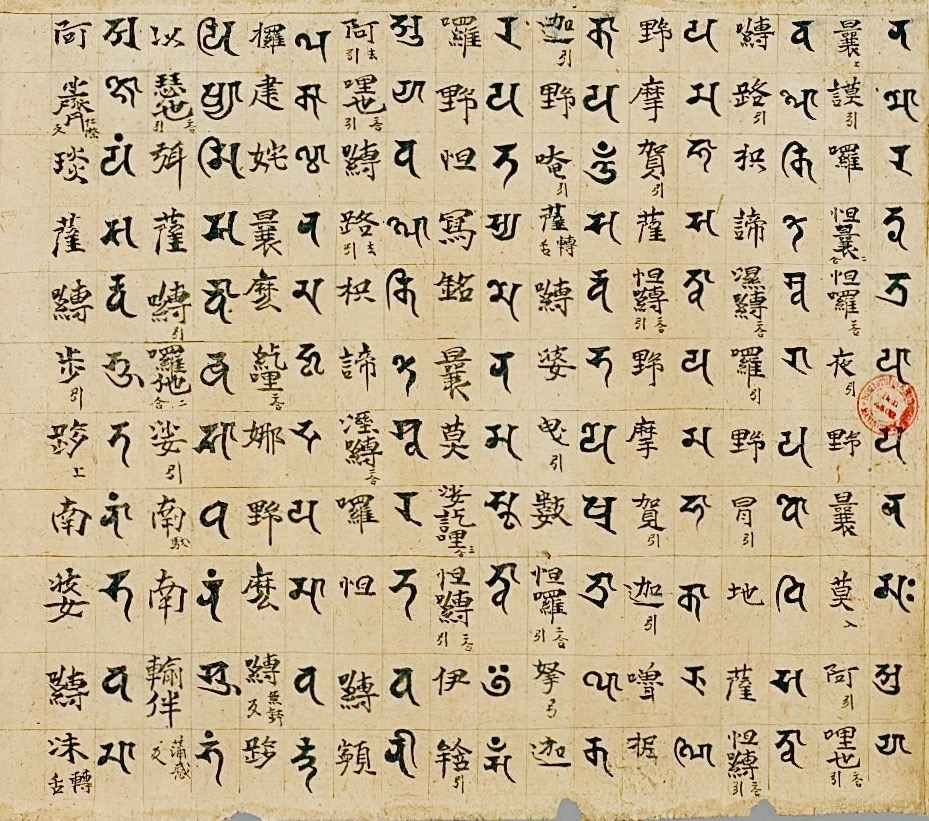
A manuscript of an Indic dhāraṇī incantation in both Siddhaṃ script and Chinese transliteration.

Semantic translations and calques of Indic Buddhist vocabulary are a key part of Buddhist Chinese. These could be single character or multiple character terms. They include key Buddhist terms like 空 (kōng; "emptiness"), which was used to translate śūnyatā, 定 (dìng; "to stabilize, settle down") for samadhi and yìshí (一時; "one time") for ekasmin samaye (at one time). Common examples of translations introduced by Kumārajīva include 性 (xìng) for dhatū (nature, source), 念處 (niàn chǔ) for smṛtyupasthāna (placement of mindfulness) and 大乘 (dàchéng; "great vehicle") for the Sanskrit term Mahāyāna. Sometimes a Chinese character was used to translate a technical term and was also retained for its standard meaning. Thus, 行 (xíng) is used as character for the term saṃskāra as well as for its standard meanings like move, act, or practice.

Furthermore, while Classical Chinese tends to prefer single-character words, Buddhist Chinese makes extensive use of two-character compounds such as 如來 (rúlái; "thus come") for tathāgata and 無我 (wúwǒ; "not-self") for anātman. As such, Buddhist Chinese contributed to the increase use of disyllabic words in Chinese.

Apart from calques, Buddhist Chinese included numerous phonetic transcriptions of Indic terms, such as bǐqiū (比丘) for bhiksus (monastics), and 菩提 (pútí) for bodhi. Some of these can be longer, especially when they transliterate long Sanskrit names. Examples include 波羅蜜 (bōluómì) for pāramitā (perfection), 菩提薩埵 (pútísàdǔo) for bodhisattva and 阿耨多羅三藐三菩提 (ānòuduōluósānmiǎosānpútí) for anuttara-samyak-saṃbodhi (unsurpassed correct enlightenment). While these terms no longer sound like their Sanskrit counterparts in modern Mandarin pronunciation, they were much closer to the Indic words in Middle Chinese pronunciation. These transliterations were also commonly shortened, thus producing púsà for bodhisattva etc.

The translator Xuanzang is particularly known for his transliterations of Indic terms. He is associated with a theory called the Five No's in Translation (五不翻), which outlines five cases in which a word should not be given a semantic translation but should instead be transcribed phonetically:

- Secrets (mantras, dharanis) should always be transliterated to preserve sacred sounds.
- Multiple meanings, one should always transliterate when a single term has several meanings, such as Bhagavat.
- Items not existing in China should be transliterated because no native equivalent exists (e.g., breadfruit).
- Transliterated terms that have already been established by past tradition for consistency, such as Fó for Buddha.
- Words for sacred beings or things that arouse religious emotion and devotion should be transliterated to avoid mundane or undignified connotations (e.g. bodhisattva).

==== Grammar and syntax ====
Chinese Buddhist texts also made use of new grammatical forms and sentence structures influenced by Indic grammar that were not found in earlier Chinese classics. Examples include the widespread use of shì as the copula "is" (while this character was mostly used as a pronoun in classical Chinese), the use of 一一 (yīyī) to mean "each" or "every one", and simple denials like bùyě, shìzūn (不也, 世尊; "No, bhagavant") from nohīda bhagavant.

Another example of these new forms of syntax can be found in the following excerpt from Kumārajīva's Lotus Sutra translation (T09.262:1c19–20):

如 是 我 聞 ： 一 時 ， 佛 住 王 舍 城 耆 闍 崛 山 中 ， 與 大 比 丘 眾 萬 二 千 人 俱

rúshì wǒ wén: yìshí, fó zhù wángshèchéng qíshéjuéshān zhōng, yǔ dà bǐqiū zhòng wàn èrqiānrén jù

Sanskrit: evaṃ mayā śrutaṃ ekasmin samaye bhagavān rājagṛhe viharati sma gṛdhakūṭe parvate mahatā bhikṣu-saṃghena sārdhaṃ dvādaśabhir bhikṣu-śataiḥ

Thus have I heard: At one time, the Revered One dwelt at the Vulture Peak in Rājagṛha together with a great congregation of 22,000 bhiksus.

The introductory phrase "thus have I heard" (如是我聞) closely parallels the Sanskrit evaṃ mayā śrutaṃ. Classical Chinese syntax would use 我聞如是 instead, with 如是 ("thus") following the predicate 聞 ("hear"). Likewise, the rest of this sentence also follows Sanskrit syntax, with the adverbial phrase "together with a great congregation of 22,000 monks" (與大比丘眾萬二千人俱) at the end of the sentence. In classical Chinese, this phrase would usually be placed after the subject and the locative preposition yú (於).

Another unique element of Buddhist Chinese is the widespread use of the passive voice which is more common in Sanskrit. Buddhist Chinese often relies on the disyllabic expression suǒjiàn (所見) which introduces a passive verb.

Yet another unique feature is the use of vocatives in the middle of a sentence, which is not acceptable in classical Chinese but widespread in Buddhist Chinese. Here's one example from Zhi Qian's Vimalakīrtinirdeśa:

時， 我 世尊 聞 是 法， 默 而 止， 不 能 加報。

Lord, at that moment, I heard this Dharma, [was] silent and stopped [speaking.]

If we follow Chinese grammar, the sentence has two subjects, "I" (我) and "Lord" (世尊), but in Buddhist Chinese, 世尊 is the vocative "O Bhagavān."

=== Sinitic and vernacular elements ===
The other key unique feature of Buddhist Chinese literature are that it draws on elements from vernacular Chinese as well as Classical Literary Chinese, to create new forms of written Chinese. The earliest translators, like Ān Shìgāo, relied on vernacular Chinese extensively in their translations, which did not conform to the classical Chinese forms. Other translators made use of both classical forms and vernaculars in varying respects. Kumārajīva's translations established Buddhist Chinese as a new variety of written Chinese based on vernacular speech as well as literary Chinese. However, the specific characteristics of Buddhist Chinese phrasing and syntax is highly variable on the style of the translator and the genre of literature being translated (or composed).

One example of this vernacularization is the inclusive adverb dūlú (都盧; "all, the whole") which was part of colloquial speech. This was combined with the ancient adverb cì (賜) to produce the compound adverb dūlúcì (都盧賜; "all, the whole, both") which can be seen in the following passage from Lokakṣema's Aṣṭasāhasrikā prajñāpāramitā sūtra: 諸人諸非人, 都盧賜來到是間 ("Various humans and various non-humans, all arrived here")

Another common Sinitic element that can be found throughout Buddhist Chinese texts is the use of four character phrases (Chinese: 成语; pinyin: chéngyǔ), a literary feature that became popular in the Eastern Han. Four character phrases were often formed by various techniques, including "adding particles for euphony” such as yù (於), ér (而), zhī (之); "doubling up synonyms", "lexical economizing" and "syntactic elision". According to Zhu, "these methods to increase or decrease the number of syllables in the Buddhist texts sometimes brought about lexical and syntactic forms that were entirely different to those found in local Chinese literature."

The Great Dharma Drum Sutra (大法鼓經; Dàfǎgǔ jīng) translated by Guṇabhadra during the Liu Song contains the following example which consists of four four-character phrases:

爾時聖王 復問佛言: 我於久如 當得成佛?

At that time the holy king replied and asked the Buddha, “how long for me – should [it take] to attain Buddhahood?

Perhaps the most obvious vernacular sayings can be found in the Chan Recorded Sayings (Yulu) genre, which contains extensive use of vernacular language, popular expressions and vulgarisms. The Song dynasty Five Lamps Compendium (五燈會元; Wǔdēng Huìyuán) contains the following exemplary passage:

這裏無祖無佛。達磨是老臊胡，釋迦老子是乾屎橛，文殊普賢是擔屎漢，等覺妙覺是破執凡夫，菩提涅槃是繫驢橛，十二分教是鬼神簿、拭瘡疣紙，四果三賢、初心十地是守古塚鬼。

There ain’t no patriarchs or buddhas here. Bodhidharma's just some stanky old barbarian. Śākyamuni's just a dried-up piece of shit. Mañjuśrī and Samantabhadra are just dudes hauling crap for a living. Equal enlightenment and wondrous enlightenment are just broken-down fools who lost their fixations. Bodhi and nirvana are just a hitching post for tying up donkeys. The whole twelve divisions of scripture is a logbook for ghosts and demons, or toilet paper for wiping your ass sores. And the four fruits, three sages, the beginner’s mind, and ten stages? Just a bunch of ghosts hanging around some old graves.

Numerous phrases in this passage, like gán shǐjué (乾屎橛; "piece of dry shit"), and dānshǐ hàn (擔屎漢; "men who carry dung") are derived from vernacular vulgarities.

== See also ==
- Chinese Buddhist canon
- Transcription into Chinese characters
- Classical Chinese
- Language contact
