= Zhi Qian =

3rd-century Chinese Buddhist translator

- Traditional Chinese: 支謙
- Simplified Chinese: 支谦
Transcriptions
Standard Mandarin
- Hanyu Pinyin: Zhī Qiān
- Wade–Giles: Chih^{1} Ch'ien^{1}

Zhi Qian (Chinese: 支謙; pinyin: Zhī Qiān; fl. 222–252 CE) was a Chinese Buddhist layman of Yuezhi ancestry who translated a wide range of Indian Buddhist scriptures into Chinese. He was the grandson (or according to another source, the son) of an immigrant from the country of the Great Yuezhi, an area that overlapped to at least some extent with the territory of the Kushan Empire. According to the Chinese custom of the time, he used the ethnonym "Zhi" as his surname, to indicate his foreign ancestry.

Of all the translators to take part in the study of Buddhist texts during this period, Zhi Qian has been described as the "most versatile" and "most prolific".

== Life ==
Zhi Qian was born in Luoyang to a notable family of Yuezhi origin. The medieval biographer, Sengyou, stated that Zhi Qian's grandfather was a Yuezhi named Fadu who along with "several hundreds" of his fellow countrymen, submitted himself before Emperor Ling of Han. As a reward "he was honored [by the Han court with the title] shuai shan zhonglang jiang (率善中郎將)".

At an early age Zhi Qian became a disciple of Zhi Liang, who in turn had been a disciple of the famous translator of Mahāyāna scriptures, Lokakṣema (fl. c. 168–189 CE), who was likewise of Yuezhi ancestry. Toward the end of the Han dynasty, as chaos spread throughout the north, Zhi Qian migrated with several dozens of his countrymen to the southern Wu kingdom. Settling first at Wuchang, then in Jianye after 229 CE. According to the earliest extant biography, contained in Sengyou's Chu sanzang ji ji, completed c. 518 CE, the Wu ruler, Sun Quan was so impressed with Zhi Qian's abilities that he appointed him tutor to the crown prince.

Toward the end of his life, Zhi Qian became an upāsaka, taking the five lay precepts and retiring to a monastic environment in the mountains. When he died at the age of sixty (in 252 CE or shortly after), the Wu ruler of the time, Sun Liang, is said to have written a letter to the monastic community mourning his death.

== Works ==
Though it seems likely that Zhi Qian had already begun translating Buddhist texts while in the northern capital of Luoyang, the bulk of his translation activity was carried out in the south. His translations—of which more than two dozen are extant today—span a wide range of genres and include both Mahāyāna and non-Mahāyāna scriptures. Among them are a number of āgama texts (i.e., non-Mahāyāna sūtras corresponding to scriptures found in the sutta section of the Pāli canon), didactic verses (including a version of the Dharmapada and the *Arthapada, corresponding to the Pāli Aṭṭhakavagga), a biography of the Buddha, and several Mahāyāna sūtras, of which some of the most famous are the Vimalakīrtinirdeśa, the Larger Sukhāvatīvyūha (dealing with the Pure Land of Amitābha), the Shorter Perfection of Wisdom scripture (corresponding to the Sanskrit Aṣṭasāhasrikā-prajñāpāramitā), and an early version of what subsequently became the Buddhāvataṃsaka.

It is extremely difficult to characterize Zhi Qian's translation style, for the corpus of his authentically attributed works ranges from elegant literary creations, in which most foreign names and terms are translated into Chinese, to much more cumbersome productions which bristle with multisyllabic transcriptions of Indian words. It seems likely that translations of the latter type, which resemble those produced by Lokakṣema, may have been produced early in his career when Zhi Qian was still an active member of the circle of Lokakṣema's heirs; the more literary works in Zhi Qian's corpus appear to have been produced after his move to the south, and they share many stylistic features with the work of his Wu-kingdom contemporary, Kang Senghui (fl. 247–280 CE). In particular, both Zhi Qian and Kang Senghui freely included indigenous Chinese religious terminology in their work. An additional factor in Zhi Qian's case was that he revised a number of translations produced by his predecessors (especially Lokakṣema), which—together with his own apparent preference for variety—may have contributed to the inconsistencies in his vocabulary and style.

== See also ==
- Silk Road transmission of Buddhism
- Zhi Yao (monk)
