= Zhi Yao (monk) =

2nd century Kushan buddhist monk

Zhi Yao (Chinese: 支曜; pinyin: Zhī Yào) was a Buddhist author or translator active in China and first mentioned in Sengyou's Collected Records Concerning the Tripitaka, a catalogue published in 515 CE of Buddhist texts translated into Chinese. The text suggests he was contemporary with the translator Lokakṣema, who lived in the second half of the second century CE during the Han dynasty.

There is only one sentence regarding Zhi Yao in Sengyou's work, found in the section on Lokakṣema, that says only, "at that time there was also Zhi Yao, who translated the Chengju guangming jing." The catalog states this text, which can be rendered in English as The Sutra on the Completion of Brightness (成具光明經), was produced during the reign of Emperor Ling of Han, which would place it somewhere in the range of 168 to 190 CE.

The surname Zhi (支) typically indicated the person bearing it was of Yuezhi ethnicity, but it was also common practice in the Han dynasty for monks to take their teacher's surname, so his background remains uncertain.

Huijiao's (慧皎) Biographies of Eminent Monks (Gaoseng zhuan, 高僧傳), produced about 530 CE, also briefly mentions Zhi Yao. It states that he was a monk, and it also attributes an additional translation to him, namely the Xiao benqi (小本起), which is apparently lost.

The Buddhologist Jan Nattier briefly analysed the one text attributed to Zhi Yao by Sengyou, The Sutra on the Completion of Brightness. She concluded that it may be a Chinese apocrypha rather than a translation of an Indian text. She provides the following reasons:

1. the text is written in a highly refined domestic Chinese style unknown from other early Chinese translations from Indic texts;
2. it makes reference to filial piety that strongly suggests a Chinese rather than Indian cultural context;
3. it jumbles together well-established Indian tropes into unique arrangements that are unknown in Indian source texts; and
4. it suggests a lack of familiarity with Indian cultural customs and monastic practices.

She also notes that the text is apparently not mentioned in other texts until the fourth century CE, while at the same time some of the word choices would be unprecedented for the second century yet are not unusual for a third or fourth century context. Taking all of the evidence together, she concludes it is difficult to confirm if Zhi Yao really existed given the time between his stated lifetime and his appearance in the historical record, and if he did, what if any relationship he had with the textual work attributed to him.

== See also ==
- Silk Road transmission of Buddhism
