= Miaoxang =

Chinese Buddhist nun (fourth century)

Miaoxang (妙相, fl. 340s AD) was a Chinese Buddhist nun known for using Buddhism as grounds for leaving her husband.

According to Baochang’s sixth-century Biographies of Nuns, Miaoxang was born Zhang Pehua in Hong-nong to a rich father, Mao, and grew up studying the classics. At the age of fifteen, she was married to a palace attendant named Huangfu Kui. She separated from him on the grounds that he had committed a breach of li (Buddhist principles) during the mourning period for one of his parents.

Miaoxang became a Buddhist nun, living on North Mountain in Hong-nong. Baochang relates that she practised here for over twenty years, receiving many disciples, and attended a religious ceremony as the guest of the governor of Hong-nong in the Yong-he period (345 – 356).

Miaoxang’s story is noted for being an unusual early case of a married woman becoming a Buddhist nun, and using the principles of Buddhism and of filial piety to remove herself from family life.
