= Zhixian (fourth century) =

Fourth-century Chinese Buddhist nun

Zhixian (originally surnamed Zhao, ca. 300 – 370) was a Chinese Buddhist nun known for her resistance to anti-Buddhist pressures in the Jin period.

== Life ==
According to the sixth-century Biographies of Buddhist Nuns by Baochang, Zhixian was from Changshan, the daughter of Zhen, a magistrate of Fuliu County. She entered the Western Nunnery in Sizhou.

Baochang tells that the Taoist governor of the area, Du Ba, aimed to reduce the number of Buddhist monks and nuns in his jurisdiction by putting them through a strict test. Zhixian was the only able-bodied nun who remained to undergo the test rather than fleeing, and was found to be well above the standard. She survived a knife attack from Du Ba when she refused his sexual advances.

Subsequently, Baochang relates, Zhixian continued to practice as a nun, gathering over a hundred followers. She received a precious gift of a brocade robe from the emperor Fu Jian. She survived into her seventies in the Tai-he period.

Zhixian’s story has been noted for her courage in the face of Taoist competition and governmental threats against Buddhism.
