= Silk Road transmission of art =

Artistic influences transited along the Silk Road

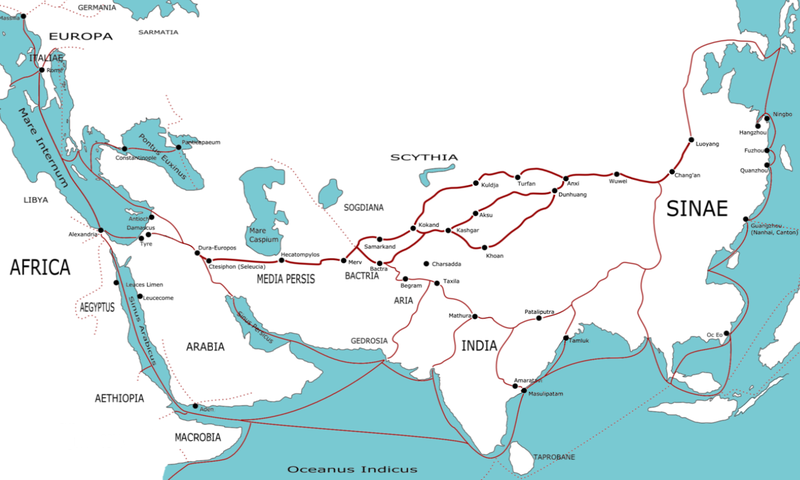
1st century CE Map of Silk Road

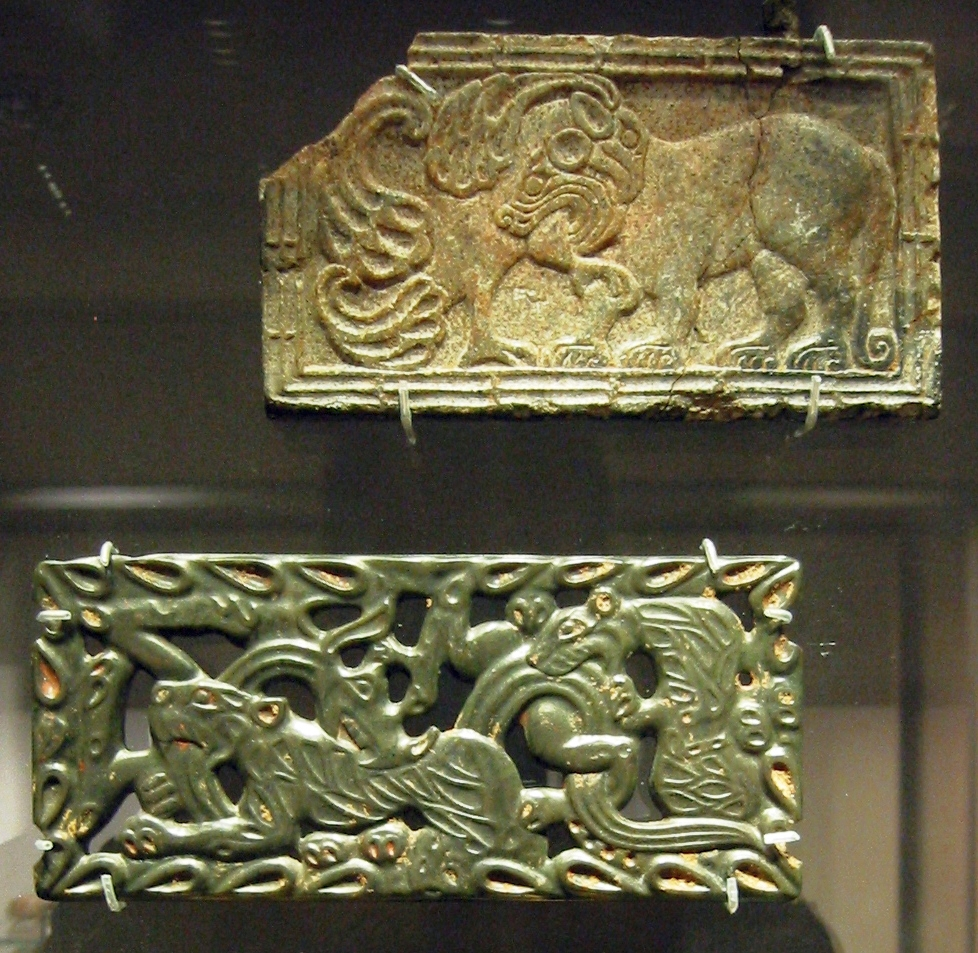
Chinese jade and steatite plaques, in the Scythian-style animal art of the steppes. 4th-3rd century BCE. British Museum.

Many artistic influences transited along the Silk Road, especially through the Central Asia, where Hellenistic, Iranian, Indian and Chinese influence were able to interact. In particular Greco-Buddhist art represent one of the most vivid examples of this interaction. As shown on the 1st century CE Silk Road map, there is no single road but a whole network of long-distance routes: mainly two land routes and one sea route.

== Scythian art ==
Following contacts of metropolitan China with nomadic western and northwestern border territories in the 8th century BCE, gold was introduced from Central Asia, and Chinese jade carvers began to make imitation designs of the steppes, adopting the Scythian-style animal art of the steppes (descriptions of animals locked in combat). This style is particularly reflected in the rectangular belt plaques made of gold and bronze with alternate versions in jade and steatite.

Nomadic Cultures along the Silk Road, like the Sarmatians and Turkic peoples, had a big influence on art styles. They used a lot of animal designs, like the ones in Scythian art, which helped shape portable art like textiles, metalwork and jewelry. These cool patterns, with animal and geometric shapes, were passed along the Silk Road by nomadic traders and ended up being mixed into the art of more settled civilizations.

Even though that happened, the correspondence between the "Scythians" as an ethnic group and their material culture is still subject to discussion and research. The subject is part of the broader "nomadic" and "sedentary" debate.

== Hellenistic art ==
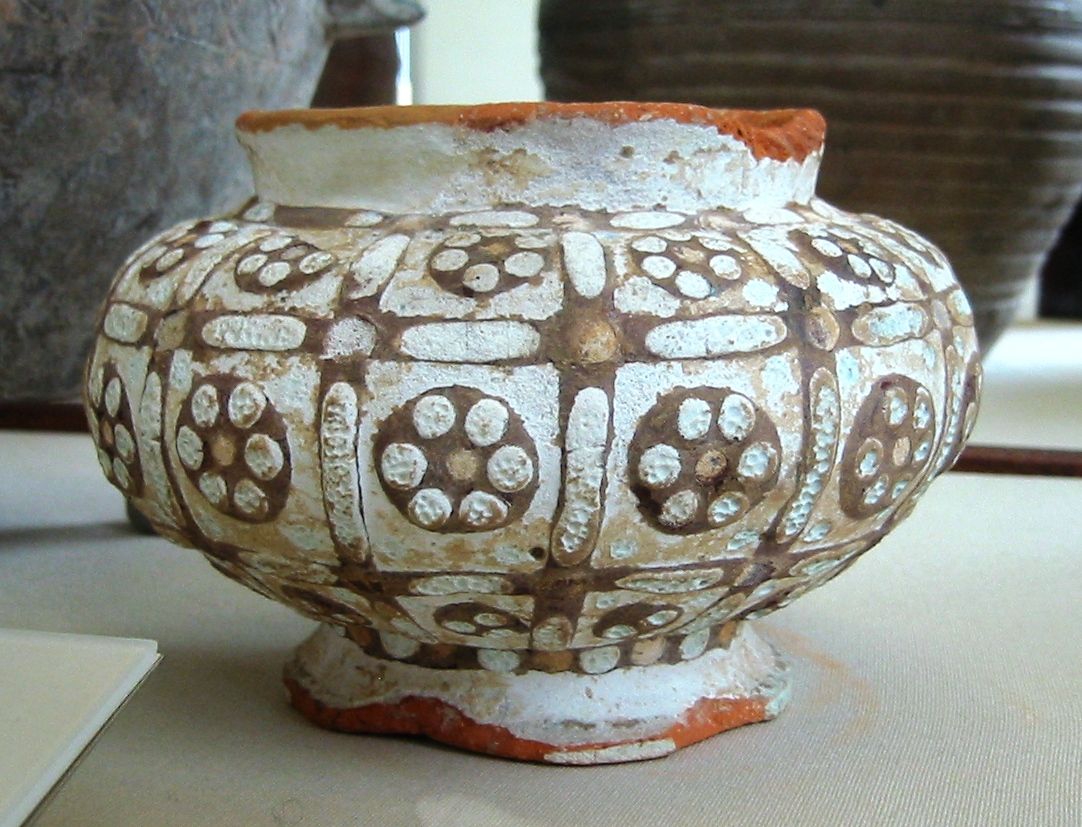
Western-influenced Zhou vase with glass inlays, 4th-3rd century BCE, British Museum.

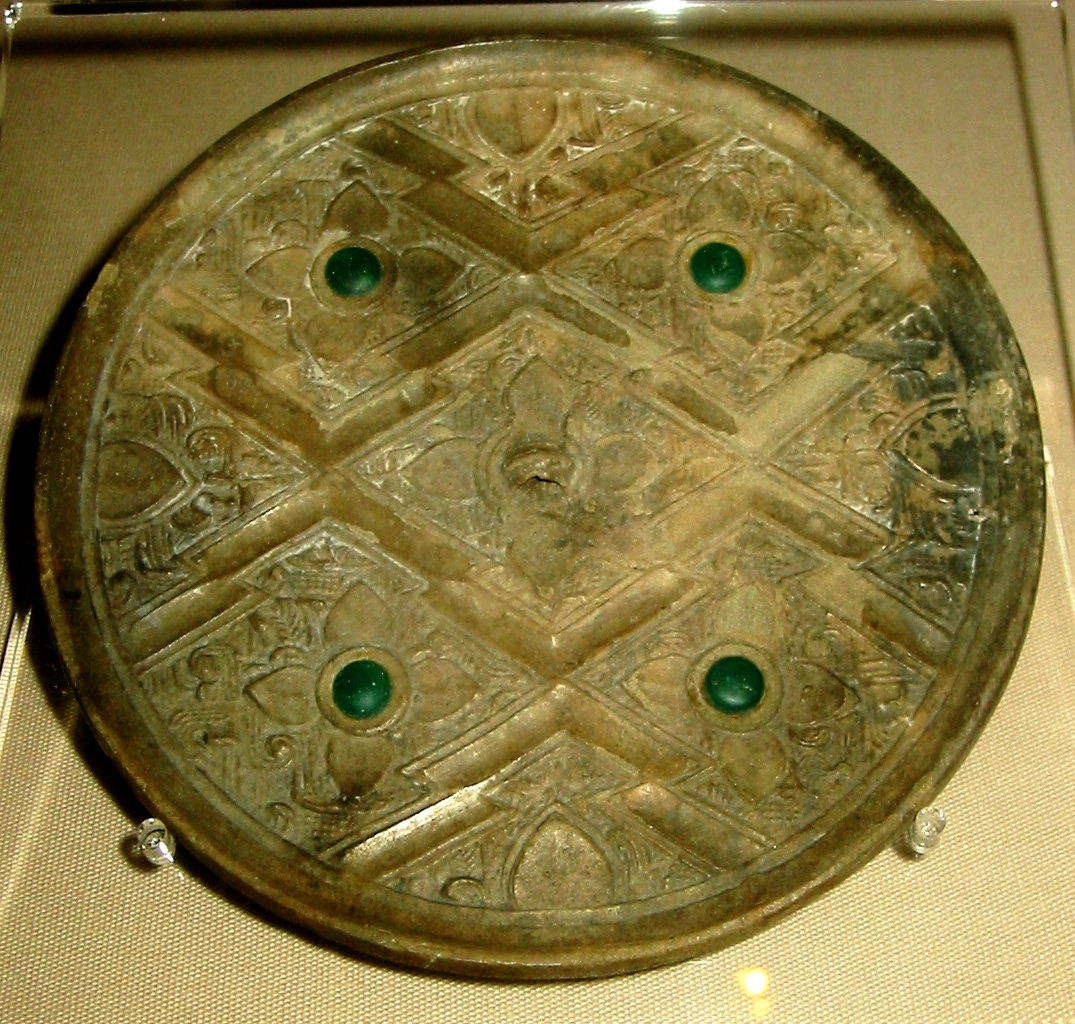
Zhou/Han bronze mirror with glass inlays, perhaps incorporated Greco-Roman artistic patterns (rosette flowers, geometric lines, and glass inlays). Victoria and Albert Museum.

Following the expansion of the Greco-Bactrians into Central Asia, Greek influences on Han art have often been suggested (Hirth, Rostovtzeff). Designs with rosette flowers, geometric lines, and glass inlays, suggestive of Hellenistic influences, can be found on some early Han dynasty bronze mirrors.

== Greco-Buddhist art ==
=== Buddha ===
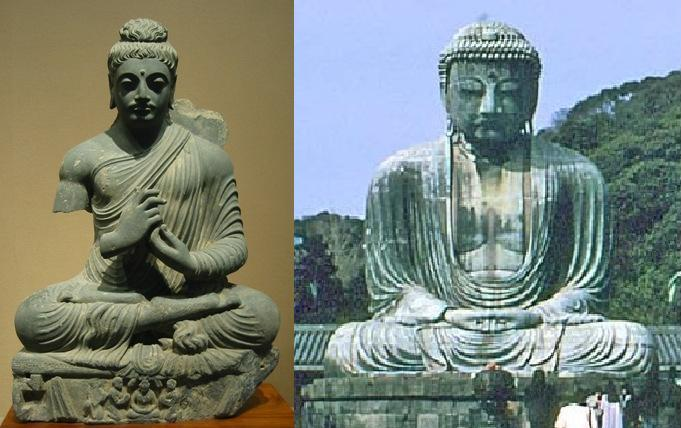
Iconographic evolution of the Buddha. Left: A buddha in the Greco-Buddhist art of Gandhara, 3rd century CE. Right: A Buddha in Kamakura, Japan (1252).

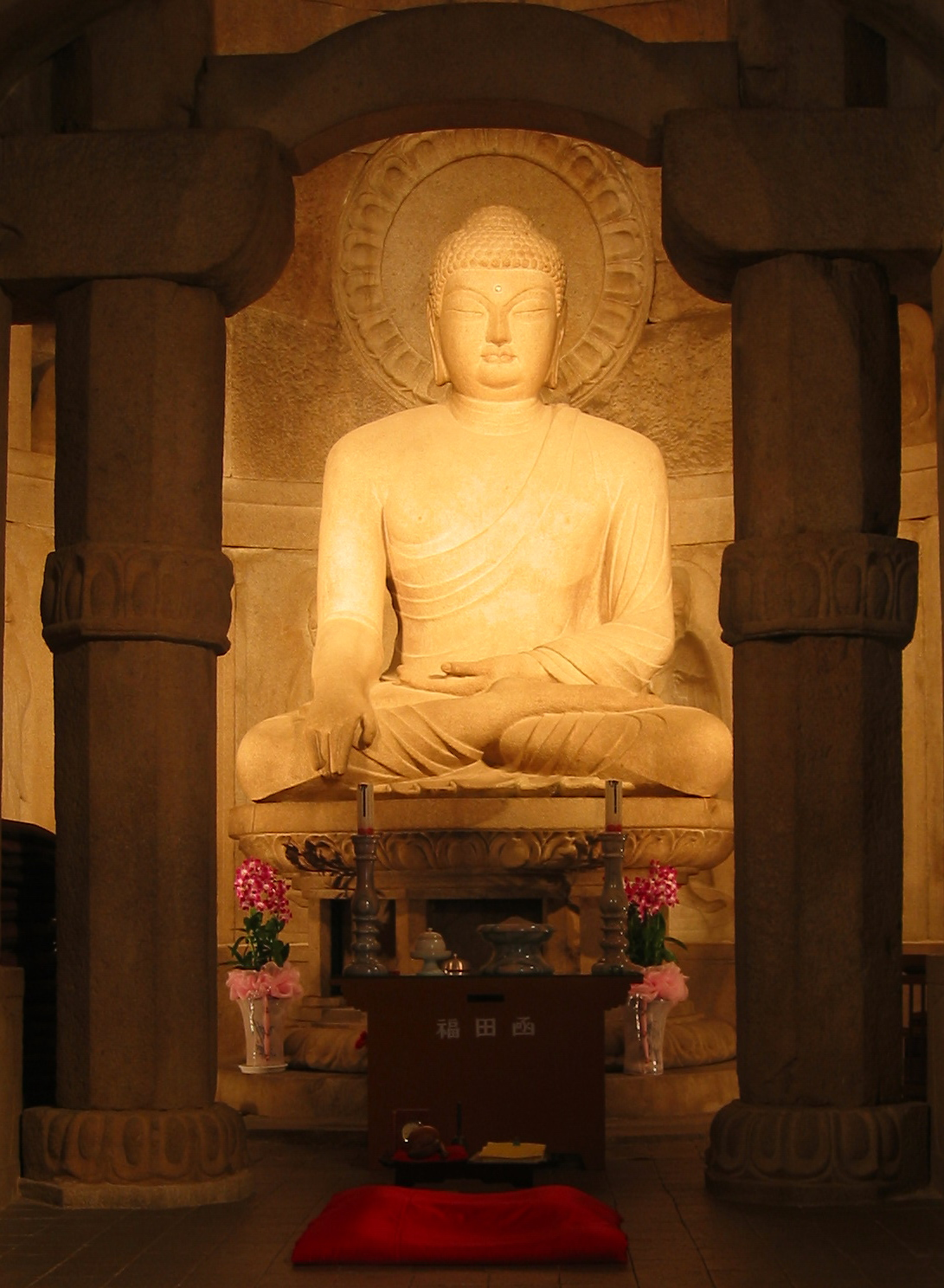
A Buddha in Seokguram, South Korea. It was influenced by Gandhara art.

The image of the Buddha, originating during the 1st century CE in Gandhara in what is now modern day's Pakistan and Mathura in northern India was transmitted progressively through Central Asia and then China until it reached Japan in the 6th century.

To this day however the transmission of many iconographical details is still visible, such as the Hercules inspiration behind the Nio guardian deities in front of Japanese Buddhist temples, or representations of the Buddha reminiscent of Greek art such as the Buddha in Kamakura.

== Eastern iconography in the West ==
Some elements of western iconography were adopted from the East along the Silk Road. The aureole in Christian art first appeared in the 5th century, but practically the same device was known several centuries earlier, in non-Christian art. It is found in some Persian representations of kings and Gods, and appears on coins of the Kushan kings Kanishka, Huvishka and Vasudeva, as well as on most representations of the Buddha in Greco-Buddhist art from the 1st century CE. Another image which appears to have transferred from China via the Silk Road is the symbol of the Three hares, showing three animals running in a circle. It has been traced back to the Sui dynasty in China, and is still to be found in sacred sites in many parts of Western Europe, and especially in churches in Dartmoor, Devon.

== Case studies ==
=== Shukongoshin ===
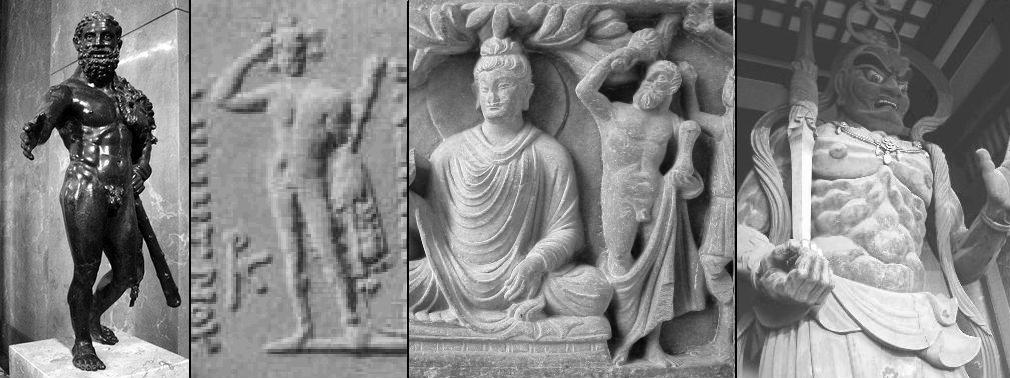
Iconographical evolution from the Greek god Herakles to the Japanese god Shukongōshin. From left to right: 1) Herakles (Louvre Museum). 2) Herakles on coin of Greco-Bactrian king Demetrius I. 3) Vajrapani, the protector of the Buddha, depicted as Herakles in the Greco-Buddhist art of Gandhara. 4) Shukongōshin, manifestation of Vajrapani, as protector deity of Buddhist temples in Japan.

Another Buddhist deity, named Shukongoshin, one of the wrath-filled protector deities of Buddhist temples in Japan, is also an interesting case of transmission of the image of the famous Greek god Herakles to the Far-East along the Silk Road. Herakles was used in Greco-Buddhist art to represent Vajrapani, the protector of the Buddha, and his representation was then used in China and Japan to depict the protector gods of Buddhist temples.

=== Wind god ===
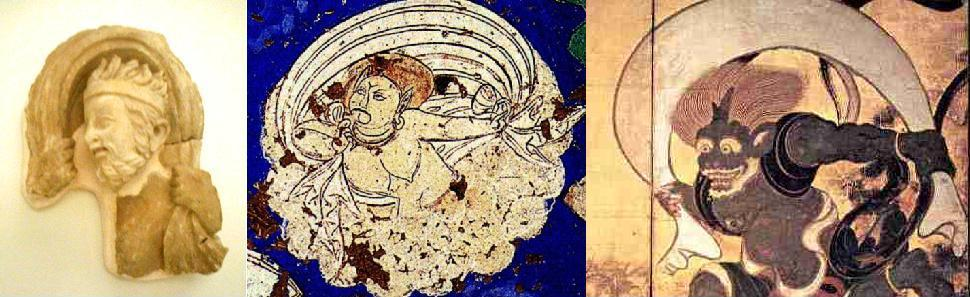
Iconographical evolution of the Wind God. Left: Greek Wind God from Hadda, 2nd century. Middle: Wind God from (Kızıl), Tarim Basin, 7th century. Right: Japanese Wind God Fūjin, 17th century.

Various other artistic influences from the Silk Road can be found in Asia, one of the most striking being that of the Greek Wind God Boreas, transiting through Central Asia and China to become the Japanese Shinto wind god Fūjin.

In consistency with Greek iconography for Boreas, the Japanese wind god holds above his head with his two hands a draping or "wind bag" in the same general attitude. The abundance of hair have been kept in the Japanese rendering, as well as exaggerated facial features.

=== Floral scroll pattern ===
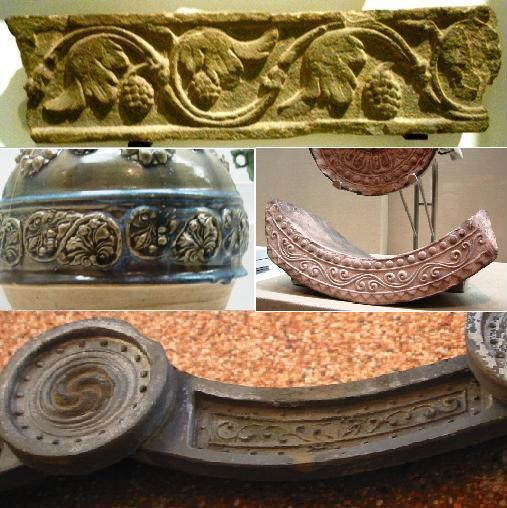
Transmission of the flower scroll pattern. Top: Gandhara frieze, 2nd century. Middle left: Chinese vase, 6th century. Middle right: Japanese temple tile, 7th century, Nara. Bottom: Tile detail from a Japanese contemporary house, Tokyo, 2005.

Finally, the Greek artistic motif of the floral scroll was transmitted from the Hellenistic world to the area of the Tarim Basin around the 2nd century CE, as seen in Serindian art and wooden architectural remains. It then was adopted by China between the 4th and 6th century, where it is found on tiles and ceramics, and was then transmitted to Japan where it is found quite literally in the decoration of the roof tiles of Japanese Buddhist temples from around the 7th century.

The clearest one are from the 7th century Nara temple building tiles, some of them exactly depicting vines and grapes. These motifs have evolved towards more symbolic representations, but essentially remain to this day in the roof tile decorations of many Japanese traditional-style buildings.

== See also ==
- Scythian art
- Greco-Buddhist art
- Silk Road transmission of Buddhism
- Mogao Caves
- Longmen Grottoes
