= East Asian Buddhism =

East Asian Mahayana Buddhism adhering the Chinese Buddhist canon

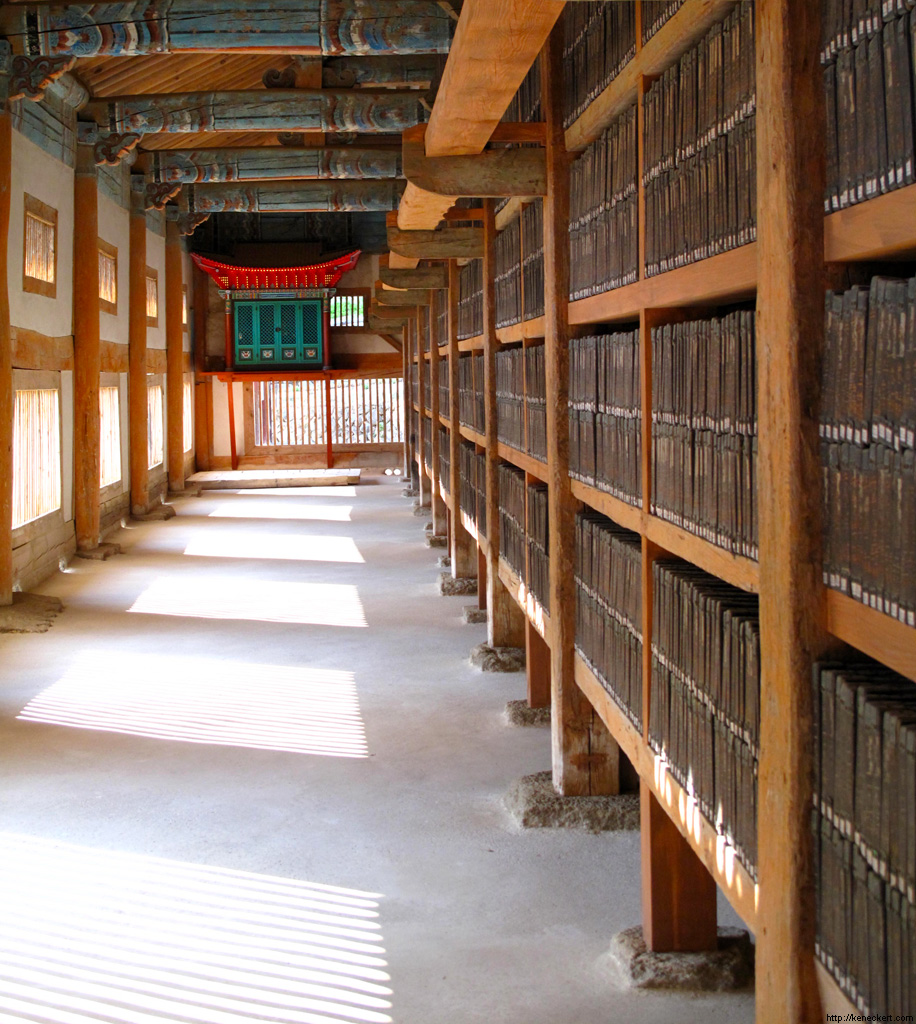
Tablets of the Tripiṭaka Koreana, an early edition of the Chinese Buddhist canon, in Haeinsa Temple, South Korea

East Asian Buddhism or East Asian Mahayana is a collective term for the schools of Mahāyāna Buddhism which developed across East Asia and which rely on the Chinese Buddhist canon and other texts written in Literary Buddhist Chinese. These include the various forms of Chinese, Japanese, Korean, and Vietnamese Buddhism. East Asian Buddhists constitute the numerically largest body of Buddhist traditions in the world, numbering over half of the world's Buddhists.

East Asian forms of Buddhism all derive from the sinicized Buddhist schools which developed during the Han dynasty and the Song dynasty, and therefore are influenced by Chinese culture and philosophy. The spread of Buddhism to East Asia was aided by the trade networks of the Silk Road and the missionary work of generations of Indian and Asian Buddhists. Some of the most influential East Asian traditions include Chan (Zen), Nichiren Buddhism, Pure Land, Huayan, Tiantai, and Chinese Esoteric Buddhism. These schools developed new, uniquely East Asian interpretations of Buddhist texts and focused on the study of Mahayana sutras. According to Paul Williams, this emphasis on the study of the sutras contrasts with the Tibetan Buddhist attitude which sees the sutras as too difficult unless approached through the study of philosophical treatises (shastras).

The texts of the Chinese Buddhist Canon began to be translated in the second century and the collection continued to evolve over a period of a thousand years with the first woodblock printed edition being published in 983. A major modern edition of this canon is the Taishō Tripiṭaka, produced in Japan between 1924 and 1932. Besides sharing a canon of scripture, the various forms of East Asian Buddhism have also adapted East Asian values and practices which were not prominent in Indian Buddhism, such as Chinese ancestor veneration and the Confucian view of filial piety.

East Asian Buddhist monastics generally follow the monastic rule known as the Dharmaguptaka Vinaya. One major exception is some schools of Japanese Buddhism where Buddhist clergy sometimes marry, without following the traditional monastic code or Vinaya. This developed during the Meiji Restoration, when a nationwide campaign against Buddhism forced certain Japanese Buddhist sects to change their practices.

== Buddhism in East Asia ==
=== Buddhism in China ===
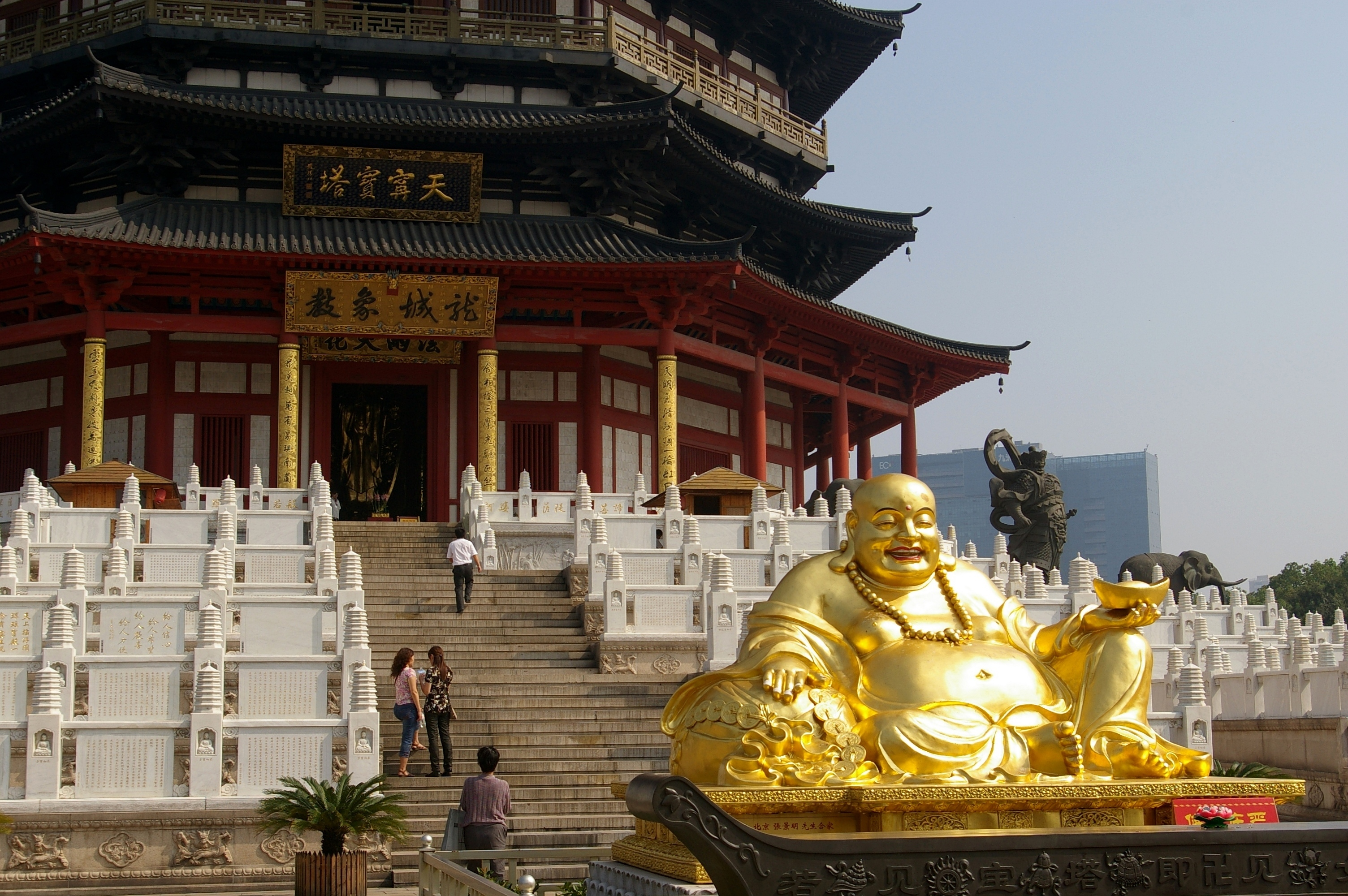
Statue of Budai (Maitreya)

Buddhism in China has been characterized by complex interactions with China's indigenous religious traditions, Taoism and Confucianism, and varied between periods of institutional support and repression from governments and dynasties. Buddhism was first introduced to China during the Han dynasty, at a time when the Han empire expanded its nascent corresponding geopolitical influence into the reaches of Central Asia. Opportunities for vibrant cultural exchanges and trade contacts along the Silk Road and sea trade routes with the Indian subcontinent and maritime Southeast Asia made it inevitable that the percolation of Buddhism would penetrate into China and gradually into the rest of East Asia at large. Such religious transmissions were able to be afforded to enable the inexorable percolation of Buddhism into East Asia over a millennia due to the vibrant cultural exchanges that were able to be made at that time as a result of the Silk Road.

Chinese Buddhism has strongly influenced the development of Buddhism in other East Asian countries, with the Chinese Buddhist Canon serving as the primary religious texts for other countries in the region.

Early Chinese Buddhism was influenced by translators from Central Asia who began the translation of large numbers of Tripitaka and commentarial texts from India and Central Asia into Chinese. Early efforts to organize and interpret the wide range of texts received gave rise to early Chinese Buddhist schools like the Huayan and Tiantai schools. In the 8th century, the Chan school began to emerge, eventually becoming the most influential Buddhist school in East Asia and spreading throughout the region.

=== Buddhism in Japan ===
The early roots of Buddhism in Japan come from Chinese and Korean influence in the 5th and 6th centuries. Ma notes that the initial rise of Buddhism in Japan can be attributed to the Soga clan (during the Asuka period), which legitimized the religion through construction of temples. Buddhism only continued to grow in Japan during the Nara period, as the religion was supported under imperial patronage. This included the creation of a new temple system, and the building of schools and temples. Shortly after, new sects such as Shingon and Tendai emerged as they developed independently during the Heian Period.

In the Kamakura period, more sects of Buddhism emerged, which includes Zen (Rinzai and Soto), Pure Land (Jodo shu and Jodo Shinshu), and Nichiren. It was during this era when these new schools provided other ways to enlightenment for the common people. They only continued to develop and differentiate themselves during the Muromachi period.

In the Tokugawa period, the shogunate closed ports to foreign exchange. There was further legitimization of Buddhism, and the shogunate enforced tight control of the temples. After the Tokugawa shogunate was overthrown, the Meiji period followed. The government promoted Shinto over Buddhism as Buddhism was seen as “foreign.”

Japanese Buddhism recovered post-World War II and maintained its influence in the 20th century. Soka Gakkai and Rissho Koseikai are examples of Buddhist organizations that have been involved in education and culture. The religion remains prominent in today's society, consisting mainly of Pure Land, Nichiren, Shingon, Zen, and Tendai Buddhism.

=== Buddhism in Korea ===
Buddhism was introduced to Korea from China during the 4th century, where it began to be practiced alongside indigenous shamanism. Following strong state support in the Goryeo era, Buddhism was suppressed during the Joseon period in favor of Neo-Confucianism. Suppression was finally ended due to Buddhist participation in repelling the Japanese invasion of Korea in the 16th century, leading to a slow period of recovery that lasted into the 20th century. The Seon school, derived from Chinese Chan Buddhism, was introduced in the 7th century and grew to become the most widespread form of modern Korean Buddhism, with the Jogye Order and Taego Order as its two main branches.

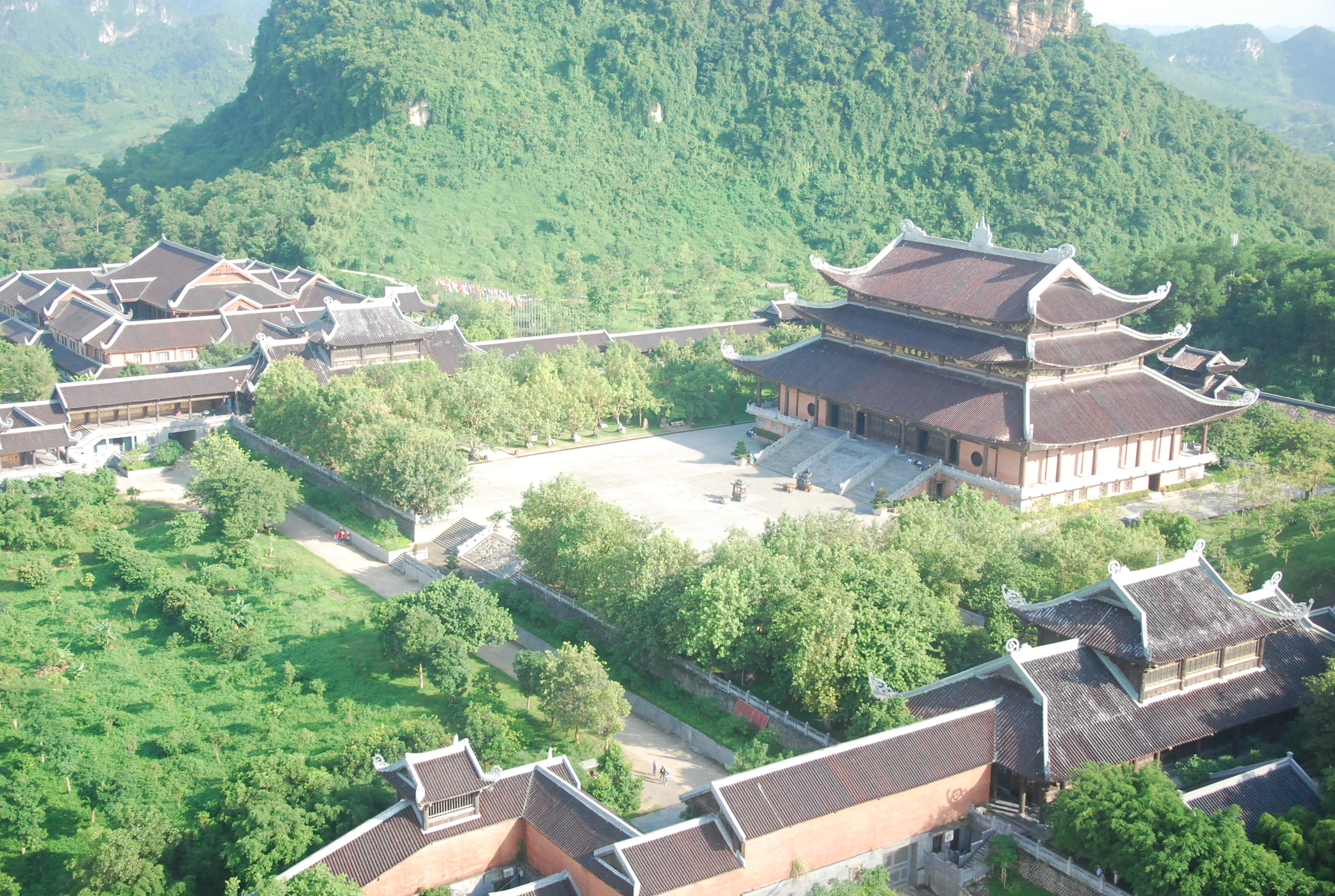
Bái Đính pagoda - Mahayana Buddhism Temple in Ninh Binh, Vietnam

=== Buddhism in Vietnam ===
Bordering southern China, Buddhism may have first come to Vietnam as early as the 3rd or 2nd century BCE from the Indian subcontinent or from China in the 1st or 2nd century CE. From the 2nd to the 4th century, Luy Lâu (now Bắc Ninh province, northern Vietnam) - capital of Jiaozhou (then part of the Han, Eastern Wu and Jin dynasties), according to Chinese historical records, was the leading Buddhist center in Southeast Asia, where Indian monks often stopped by sea to translate Buddhist scriptures from Sanskrit to Classical Chinese, before gradually moving up to Guangzhou area. Vietnamese Buddhism was influenced by certain elements of Taoism, Chinese spirituality, and Vietnamese folk religion. Buddhism was the state religion of Dai Viet during the Đinh dynasty (968–981), Lý dynasty (1009–1225) and Trần dynasty (1225–1400). Trúc Lâm thiền school was founded by Trần Nhân Tông - 3rd Emperor of Trần dynasty in late 12th century.

== Traditional schools of East Asian Buddhism ==
East Asian Buddhism has a wide variety of traditions, lineages and schools (Chinese: zōng), which developed in China and are also reflected in Korean, Japanese and Vietnamese Buddhism. Traditional Asian Buddhist scholars like Sheng-yen and Gyōnen (1240–1321) enumerated thirteen Buddhist traditions or schools. These various traditions changed and evolved over time. Some are now defunct or were absorbed into new traditions while some survived or were revived as living traditions. These "traditions" are not always rigid designations as there has always been considerable intermixing among them. Many temples and communities are influenced by many of these traditions, each consisting of different numerous sub-schools or sects.

These "thirteen schools" are:

- The Chengshi school (now defunct), which focused on the study of the Chengshilun ("The Treatise that Accomplishes Reality").
- The Kosa School (俱舍宗, now defunct), based on the study of Abhidharma using the Abhidharmakośa of Vasubandhu.
- The "Three Treatises" school (三論; Sānlùn; Chinese Madhyamaka), founded by Kumarajiva (344–413 CE).
- The Consciousness Only school (唯識宗; Wéishí, Yogācāra), a.k.a. Faxiang ("dharma characteristics") school, founded by Xuanzang (602–664) and based on his Chengweishilun ("The Demonstration of Consciousness-only").
- The Tiantai school, also known as the Lotus school, due to their focus on the Lotus Sutra. In Japan it is known as Tendai.
- The Huayan school, the school of the Avatamsaka Sutra (Huayanjing).
- The Pure Land tradition, including the Japanese Jōdo-shū and Jōdo Shinshū schools.
- The Nirvana School (now defunct), based on the Mahāyāna Mahāparinirvāṇa Sūtra translated by Dharmarakṣa (c. 233–310); this was later absorbed into the Tiantai school.
- The Dilun school (now defunct) based on the Daśabhūmikā sutra translated by Bodhiruci; this was later absorbed into the Huayan tradition.
- The Shelun school (now defunct) based on Asanga's Summary of the Mahayana translated by Paramartha; it was later absorbed into the Huáyán and Consciousness-only schools.
- The Vinaya school or Nanshan school, a historical tradition which focused on the Dharmaguptaka monastic discipline, established by the monk Daoxuan (596–667).
- The Chan (Dhyana, "Meditation") school, i.e. the Zen tradition attributed to the founder Bodhidharma, which focuses on sitting meditation (zuòchán) and developed numerous sub-schools like Caodong and Linji. This tradition spread throughout Asia. In Japan it is Japanese Zen, in Korea it is known as Seon, and in Vietnam it is known as Thiền.
- The Truc Lam School (竹林禪派, Vietnamese: Thiền phái Trúc Lâm), founded by Tran Nhan Tong, Emperor of Dai Viet, in 1299.
- The Zhenyan school (真言宗; 'true word'; "mantra" school", i.e., Chinese Esoteric Buddhism. Also called Mìjiao (密教; "Esoteric Teaching"), Mìzōng (密宗; "Esoteric Tradition"), or Tángmì (唐密; "Tang Esoterica"). This tradition was transmitted to Japan by Kūkai, where it is known as Shingon.

== See also ==
- Buddhism in Southeast Asia
- Buddhism by country
- Buddhism and Eastern religions
- Filial piety in Buddhism
- Silk Road transmission of Buddhism
- Southern, Eastern and Northern Buddhism
