= Chu sanzang ji ji =

Chinese Buddhist texts

The Chu sanzang jiji or Collected Records Concerning the Tripitaka (出三藏記集, T 2145) includes the earliest extant catalog of Chinese Buddhist texts. It was compiled by Sengyou of the Liang Dynasty and finished c. 515 CE. In addition to the catalog, the Chu sanzang jiji also includes an introduction describing the translation process and its challenges, a collection of biographies of translators, and a set of prefaces to scriptures giving historical context. Sengyou's main source in the compilation of the catalog was a catalog compiled by Dao'an (312–385), which is now lost.

The Chu sanzang jiji is included in Volume 55 of the Taishō Tripiṭaka in fifteen fascicles. An edition of the text by Jinren Su and Liani Xiao corrects the punctuation errors in the Taishō Tripiṭaka.

== Outline ==
The overall outline of the text is as listed below.

- Introduction - fascicle 1
- Catalog - fascicles 2–5
- Prefaces - fascicles 6–12
- Biographies - fascicles 13–15

The catalog is divided into the following categories:

Outline of the Catalog
Fascicle	Chinese	English
2	新集撰出經律論	New list of sutras, Vinaya, and treatises
2	新集條解異出經	New list of different translations of sutras
2	新集表序四部律	New list of tables, prefaces, and Four Part Vinaya
3	新集安公古異經	New compilation of Dao'an’s old list of sutras
3	新集安公失譯經	New compilation of Dao'an’s list of sutras with anonymous translators
3	新集安公涼土異經	New compilation of Dao'an’s list from Liangzhou of different translations of sutras
3	新集安公關中異經	New list of Dao'an’s list from Guanzhong of different translations of sutras
3	新集律分為五部記	New list of Five Part Vinaya records
3	新集律分為十八部記	New list of Vinaya records of the eighteen schools
3	新集律來漢地四部記	New list of records of the Four Part Vinaya which have circulated in China
4	新集續撰失譯雜經	New continued list of anonymously translated sutras
5	新集抄經	New list of condensed scriptures
5	新集安公疑經	New compilation of Dao'an’s list of doubtful scriptures
5	新集疑經	New list of doubtful scriptures
5	新集安公注經及雜經志	New compilation of Dao'an’s list of annotated scriptures and miscellaneous treatises
5	小乘迷學竺法度造異儀記	Heterodox Ritual Notes Created by Fervent Student of Hīnayāna Zhu Fadu
5	長安叡法師喻疑	Doubtful allegories from Venerable Rui of Chang’an

== Influence ==
The Chu sanzang jiji has been a source of information on dates and translator attribution for later catalogs and East Asian Buddhist canons. Radich states that Fei Changfang appears to used Chu sanzang jiji attribution data in his Records of the Three Treasuries Throughout Successive Dynasties (歷代三寳記; T2034) in addition his own questionable attributions. These attributions and dates have been used in the Taishō Tripiṭaka.
