= Lokaksema (Buddhist monk) =

2nd-century Indian Buddhist monk

- Born: 147 CE
- Occupations: Buddhist monk, scholar, translator, and missionary

Lokakṣema (लोकक्षेम, Chinese: 支婁迦讖; pinyin: Zhī Lóujiāchèn) (flourished 147–189) was a Kushan Buddhist monk who travelled to China during the Han dynasty and is one of the first known translators of Mahayana religious texts into any language.

== Biography ==
Details of Lokakṣema's life come to us via a short biography by Sengyou (僧祐; pinyin: Sēngyòu; 445–518 CE) and his text "Collected Records concerning the Tripitaka" (出三藏記集 Chu sanzang jìjí, T2145).

The name 婁迦讖 is usually rendered in Sanskrit as Lokakṣema, though this is disputed by some scholars, and variants such as Lokakṣama have been proposed. In particular the character 讖 can be read as chen or chan. Sengyou refers to him as Zhīchèn (Chinese: 支讖). The Zhī (Chinese: 支) prefix added to his Chinese name suggests that Lokaksema was of Yuezhi (Chinese: 月支) ethnicity. He is traditionally said to have been a Kushan, though the Chinese term Yuezhi covered a broad area of what is now Iran, Afghanistan, and Pakistan.

Given his background, Lokaksema was very likely to have been multilingual and have had knowledge of various languages including Gandhari Prakrit which was used as the language of religion, administration, and commerce in the North Western parts of India. It is speculated however by the scholar, Paul Harrison, that his mother tongue was Bactrian.

Lokaksema arrived in the Han capital Luoyang toward the end of the reign of Emperor Huan of Han (r.147-168), and between 178 and 189 CE translated a number of Mahayāna Buddhist texts into Chinese.

Lokaksema's translation activities, as well as those of the Parthians An Shigao and An Xuan slightly earlier, or his fellow Yuezhi Dharmarakṣa (around 286 CE) illustrate the key role Central Asians had in propagating Buddhism to the countries of East Asia. With the decline and fall of the Han, the empire fell into chaos and Lokakṣema disappeared from the historical record so we do not know the date of his death.

=== Extant translations ===
The editors of the Taishō Tripiṭaka attribute twelve texts to Lokakṣema. These attributions have been studied in detail by Erik Zürcher, Paul Harrison, and Jan Nattier, and some have been called into question.

Zürcher considers it reasonably certain that Lokakṣema translated the following:

- T224. 道行般若經. A translation of the Aṣṭasāhasrikā Prajñāpāramitā Sūtra.
- T280. 佛說兜沙經. The Scripture on the Tusita Heaven, part of the proto-Avatamsaka Sutra
- T313. 阿閦佛國經. Akṣohhya-vyūha
- T350. 說遺日摩尼寶經. Kaśyapaparivrata
- T418. 般舟三昧經. Pratyutpanna Samādhi Sūtra
- T458. 文殊師利問菩薩署經. Mañjuśrī's Inquiry Concerning the Bodhisattva Career.
- T626. 阿闍世王經. Ajātaśatru Kaukṛtya Vinodana Sūtra
- T807. 佛說內藏百寶經. The Hundred Jewels of the Inner Treasury.

According to Nattier, Harrison "expresses reservations" concerning the Akṣohhya-vyūha (T313), and considers that T418 is the product of revision and does not date from Lokakṣema's time.

Conversely, Harrison considers that the following ought to be considered genuine:

- T624 伅真陀羅所問如來三昧經 Druma-kinnara-rāja-paripṛcchā-sūtra

A characteristic of Lokakṣema's translation style was the extensive transliteration of Indic terms and his retention of India stylistic features such as long sentences. He typically rendered Indic verse as Chinese prose, making no attempt to capture the meter. Based on evidence from Chinese catalogues of texts, Nattier suggests that T224 and T418 are representative of Lokakṣema and might stand as "core texts", i.e. as representative of his style of translating, although both show some signs of later editing. A second tier of texts—T280, T350, T458, and T807—all strongly resemble Lokakṣema's core texts, though with occasional anomalies. T624 and T626 form a third tier with more deviations from the distinctive style of Lokakṣema. If T313 was indeed a translation by Lokakṣema, it has been extensively revised by an unknown editor, though the prose sections are closer to his style than the verse.

=== Lost works ===
Several translations attributed to Lokakṣema have been lost:

- Shoulengyan jing (a version of the Suramgama-samādhi-sutra, already lost in Sengyou's time)
- Guangming sanmei jing "Sutra on the Samadhi of Luminosity"
- Hu banniehuan jing "The Hu Parinirvāṇa Sutra"
- Bo benjing ("The Original *Puṣya Sutra")

== See also ==
- History of Buddhism
- Buddhist texts
- Silk Road transmission of Buddhism
