= Baochang (monk) =

Buddhist monk, librarian, and author during the Liang dynasty China

Baochang (寶唱; Bǎochàng) (466-518? CE) was a Buddhist monk, librarian, and author during the Liang dynasty in China.

== Biography ==
Baochang came from a poor family in Wu. He had to work hard in the fields to provide for himself and his parents. Because the plot of land they owned was too small to provide ample means of living, he looked around for other jobs on the side. Thus he found work as a copyist and was able to make some extra money.

In 483, Sengyou was ordered to go to Wu and Baochang immediately left the family life to become his disciple. After fleeing east from the chaos that accompanied the fall of the Southern Qi, he was summoned by Emperor Wu of the Liang to take up the position as abbot of the Xin'an (新安) monastery in 505 AD. Baochang participated in a number of translation and cataloguing projects under imperial patronage.

In 510, Baochang became very ill. Fearing the worst, he started praying, and uttered the two vows that, should he recover, he would search around for Buddhist scriptures everywhere to make sure nothing would get lost, and along the way search for records of monks of past generations to honour and perpetuate their memories. In attempting to fulfill this vow he abandoned his duties as abbot and was banished to Guangzhou 廣州 for about four years, during which time he worked on his biographies. Baochang was allowed back to the capital in 514.

In 515, Baochang was Commissioned by Emperor Wu to compile an official catalogue of Buddhist scriptures in the Liang Imperial library. 梁世眾經目錄 (Pinyin: Liángshì zhòngjīng mùlù) "A Catalog of Scriptures of the Liang Dynasty". This was recognised as the official catalog of the Liang Dynasty ahead of the (still extant) catalog by his teacher Sengyou from the same period (T2145).

The date of his death is not known with certainty but was likely to have been around 518. He is known to have produced at least 11 original works and contributed to a number of other literary projects.

== Works ==
- 梁世眾經目錄 A Catalog of Scriptures of the Liang Dynasty. 521 CE. (No longer extant)
- 名僧傳. Biographies of Famous Monks. 544 CE (No longer extant)
- 比丘尼傳. Biographies of Nuns (T 2063).

== Bibliography ==
- De Rauw, T. (2008). Beyond Buddhist apology: the political use of Buddhism by emperor Wu of the Liang Dynasty (r. 502-549). Thesis Ghent University. Faculty of Arts and Philosophy, Ghent, Belgium. https://biblio.ugent.be/publication/516328
