= Sengyou =

Chinese Buddhist bibliographer (445-518)

Sengyou (Chinese: 僧祐; pinyin: Sēngyòu; 445–518 AD) was a Buddhist monk and early medieval Chinese bibliographer and noted chiefly for being the author of Collected Records Concerning the Tripitaka (出三藏記集 Chu sanzang ji ji, T 2145), which includes a catalogue of Buddhist texts translated into Chinese, and the Collection on the Propagation and Clarification of Buddhism (弘明集 Hong Ming Ji, T 2102)

Sengyou's ancestral home was Xiapi in Pengcheng Commandery (northwest of modern Suining, Jiangsu). However, his father moved to Jiankang (建康), where he was born. His secular name was Yu. As a young boy he practiced devotions at Jianchu Monastery. At 14, rather than acquiesce to an arranged marriage, he took novice vows and entered Dinglin Monastery, Zhongshan in Jiankang. He was ordained as a bhikkhu aged 20 and received instruction in Vinaya by Faying (d.480). He became renown as a master of the Vinaya.

== Collected Records Concerning the Tripitaka ==
Although there were earlier works of bibliography with respect to Buddhist texts at the time, Sengyou's Collected Records Concerning the Tripitaka (Chu sanzang ji ji) introduced important innovations in how the texts were arranged, including a hierarchy of authenticity. Not only were Buddhist texts continually trickling in along the Silk Road, but the Chinese had begun to pass off local productions as authentic Indian sutras. Sengyou proposed criteria for assessing the authenticity of Buddhist sutras at a time when many fake or apocryphal texts were in circulation. He was particularly focussed on the translator of a text, and this made him suspicious of unattributed texts. As Tanya Storch says, "Absence of information about the translator was a signal that it might be a compilation by a Chinese person who did not understand Sanskrit and had never studied Buddhism in the west [i.e. India].

The Chu sanzang ji ji is presented in five sections

1. A discussion on the provenance of translated scriptures,
2. A record of (new) titles and their listings in earlier catalogues,
3. Prefaces to scriptures,
4. Miscellaneous treatises on specific doctrines, and
5. Biographies of translators.

"By subjecting Buddhist scriptures to the textual criticism similar to that applied to the Confucian classics, Sengyou managed to elevate the literary and social status of the Tripiṭaka.” At the Liang court, Sengyou's work was overshadowed by the catalogue of Baochang (寶唱) who produced his catalogue in 521 CE. However, it is Sengyou's catalogue that survives.

Sengyou was assisted in his literary work by his student, Liu Xie, who went on to write Wenxin Diaolong, an important work on literary aesthetics.

== Bibliography ==
- Buswell, R and Lopez D. (Eds) The Princeton Encyclopedia of Buddhism.
- Knechtges David R. and Chang Taiping (eds). 2014. Ancient and Early Medieval Chinese Literature (vol. 2) Brill
- Storch, T. (2014). The History of Chinese Buddhist Bibliography. Amherst, NY: Cambria Press.
