= Dharmaratna =

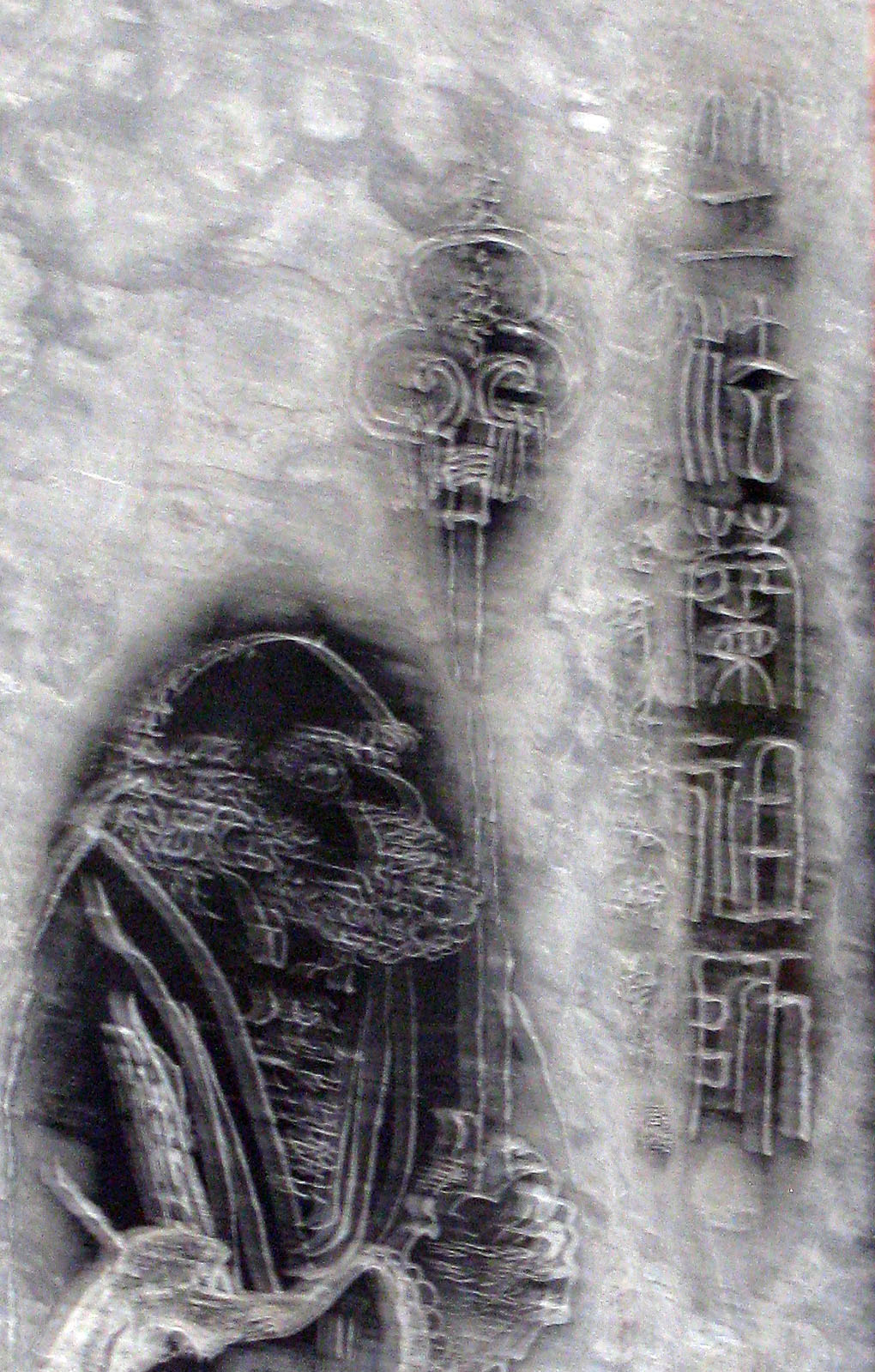
- Tumulus marker of Dharmaratna located in White Horse Temple, Luoyang, China

Personal life
- Born: unknown Central India
- Died: unknown Luoyang, Henan, China
- Flourished: 50-80 CE
- Notable work: Sutra in Forty-two Sections
- Occupation: Buddhist monk who introduced Buddhism to China, translator from Sanskrit to Chinese

Religious life
- Religion: Buddhism

Dharmaratna

Chinese name
- Traditional Chinese: 竺法蘭
- Simplified Chinese: 竺法兰
Transcriptions
Standard Mandarin
- Hanyu Pinyin: Zhú Fǎlán
- Wade–Giles: Chu^{2} Fa^{3} lan^{2}

Sanskrit name
- Sanskrit: धर्मरत्न

Dharmaratna, Gobharana, or Zhu Falan (竺法蘭) was an Indian Buddhist monk who is traditionally believed to have first introduced Buddhism to China in the 1st century CE.

According to popular accounts of Chinese Buddhism, Emperor Ming of Han dreamt of a golden deity interpreted as the Buddha and sent a delegation to India. They returned circa 67 CE with the monks Kasyapa Matanga and Dharmaratna, and white horses carrying Buddhist texts and images. The emperor established White Horse Temple in the Han capital Luoyang, where the two supposedly first translated the Sutra of Forty-two Chapters into Chinese.
