= Sutra of Forty-two Chapters =

Sutra in Mahāyāna Buddhism

The Sutra of Forty-two Chapters (also called the Sutra of Forty-two Sections, Chinese: 四十二章經) is often regarded as the first Indian Buddhist sutra translated into Chinese. However, this collection of aphorisms may have appeared some time after the first attested translations, and may even have been compiled in Central Asia or China. According to tradition, it was translated by two Yuezhi monks, Kasyapa Matanga (迦葉摩騰) and Dharmaratna (竺法蘭), in 67 CE. Because of its association with the entrance of Buddhism to China, it is accorded a very significant status in East Asia. The Tibetan translation (Toh. 359a) is known as the The Dhāraṇī of a Hundred Thousand Ornaments of the Seat of Enlightenment (Tib. dum bu zhe gnyis pa'i mdo; Skt. Bodhimaṇḍasyālaṃkāralakṣadhāraṇī).

== Story of translation ==
In the Annals of the Later Han and the Mouzi lihuo lun, Emperor Ming of Han (r. 58-75 C.E.) was said to have dreamed of a spirit, who had a "gold body" and a head which emitted "rays of light". His advisers identified the spirit as Buddha, who was supposed to have the power of flight. The emperor then ordered a delegation (led by Zhang Qian) to go west looking for the Buddha's teachings. The envoys returned, bringing with them the two Indian monks Kasyapa Matanga and Dharmaratna, and brought them back to China along with the sutra. When they reached the Chinese capital of Luoyang, the emperor had the White Horse Temple built for them.

They are said to have translated six texts, the Sutra of Dharmic-Sea Repertory (法海藏經), Sutra of the Buddha's Deeds in His Reincarnations (佛本行經), Sutra of Terminating Knots in the Ten Holy Terras (十地斷結經), Sutra of the Buddha's Reincarnated Manifestations (佛本生經), Compilation of the Divergent Versions of the Two Hundred and Sixty Precepts (二百六十戒合異), and the Sutra of Forty-two Chapters. Only the last one has survived.

Scholars, however, question the date and authenticity of the story. First, there is evidence that Buddhism was introduced into China prior to the date of 67 given for Emperor Ming's vision. Nor can the sutra be reliably dated to the first century. In 166 C.E., in a memorial to Emperor Huan, the official Xiang Kai referred to this scripture multiple times. For example, Xiang Kai claims that, "The Buddha did not pass three nights under the [same] mulberry tree; he did not wish to remain there long," which is a reference to Section 2 of the scripture. Furthermore, he also refers to Section 24 of the scripture, when Xiang Kai tells the story of a deity presenting a beautiful maiden to the Buddha, to which the Buddha replies that "This is nothing but a leather sack filled with blood." Nonetheless, while these sections seem to mirror the extant edition of the text, it is possible that the edition we now have differs substantially from the version of the text circulating in the second century.

== Structure and comparison with other works ==
The Sutra of Forty-two Chapters consists of a brief prologue and 42 short chapters (mostly under 100 Chinese characters), composed largely of quotations from the Buddha. Most chapters begin "The Buddha said..." (佛言...), but several provide the context of a situation or a question asked of the Buddha. The scripture itself is not considered a formal sutra, and early scriptures refer to the work as "Forty-two Sections from Buddhist Scriptures" or "The Forty-two Sections of Emperor Xiao Ming."

It is unclear whether the scripture existed in Sanskrit in this form, or was a compilation of a series of passages extracted from other canonical works in the manner of the Analects of Confucius. This latter hypothesis also explains the similarity of the repeated "The Buddha said..." and "The Master said," familiar from Confucian texts, and may have been the most natural inclination of the Buddhist translators in the Confucian environment, and more likely to be accepted than a lengthy treatise. Among those who consider it based on a corresponding Sanskrit work, it is considered to be older than other Mahayana Sutras, because of its simplicity of style and naturalness of method. Scholars have also been able to find the aphorisms present in this scripture in various other Buddhist works such as Digha, Majjhima, Samyutta, Anguttara Nikayas, and Mahavagga. Furthermore, scholars are also uncertain if the work was first compiled in India, Central Asia, or China.

== In fiction ==
The Sutra of Forty-two Chapters is mentioned in the wuxia novel The Deer and the Cauldron by Jin Yong. In the novel, there are eight copies of the Sutra, each containing a piece of a map leading to a treasure vault hidden in a secret location in Northeast China, and the commanders of the Eight Banners each hold one copy for safekeeping. The protagonist Wei Xiaobao finds all the pieces by chance and gains access to the treasure.

== In modern Buddhism ==
The Sutra in Forty-two Chapters is well known in East Asian Buddhism today. It has also played a role in the spread of Buddhism to the West. Shaku Soen (1859–1919), the first Japanese Zen master to teach in the West, gave a series of lectures based on this sutra in a tour of America in 1905–6. John Blofeld, included a translation of this scripture in a series begun in 1947.

== Text of the Sutra ==
=== Translations ===
==== English ====
- Shaku, Soyen: Suzuki, Daisetz Teitaro, trans. (1906). The Sutra of Forty-two Chapters, in: Sermons of a Buddhist Abbot, Zen For Americans, Chicago, The Open Court Publishing Company, pp. 3-24
- Matanga, Kasyapa, Ch'an, Chu, Blofeld, John (1977). The Sutra of Forty-Two Sections, Singapur: Nanyang Buddhist Culture Service. OCLC
- The Buddhist Text Translation Society (1974). The Sutra in Forty-two Sections Spoken by the Buddha. Lectures by the Venerable Master Hsuan Hua given at Gold Mountain Monastery, San Francisco, California, in 1974. (Translation with commentaries)
- Beal, Samuel, trans. (1862). The Sutra of the Forty-two Sections, Journal of the Royal Asiatic Society 19, 337-348.
- Chung Tai Translation Committee (2009), The Sutra of Forty-Two Chapters, Sunnyvale, CA
- Sharf, Robert H. (1996). "The Scripture in Forty-two Sections". In: Religions of China In Practice Ed. Donald S. Lopez Jr. Princeton: Princeton University Press, pp. 360–364
- Heng-ching Shih (transl.), The Sutra of Forty-two Sections, in: Apocryphal Scriptures, Berkeley, Numata Center for Buddhist Translation and Research, 2005, pp 31–42. ISBN 1-886439-29-X
- Matsuyama, Matsutaro, trans. (1892): The Sutra of forty-two sections and other two short Sutras, transl. from the Chinese originals, Kyoto: The Buddhist Propagation Society

==== German ====
- Karl Bernhard Seidenstücker (1928). Die 42 Analekta des Buddha; in: Zeitschrift für Buddhismus, Jg. 1 (1913/14), pp. 11–22; München: revised edition: Schloß-Verlag. (based on D.T. Suzuki's translation)

==== Latin ====
- Alexander Ricius, Orsa Quadraginta duorum capitum
