= Kasyapa Matanga =

Indian Buddhist monk (died AD 73)

Kāśyapa Mātaṇga
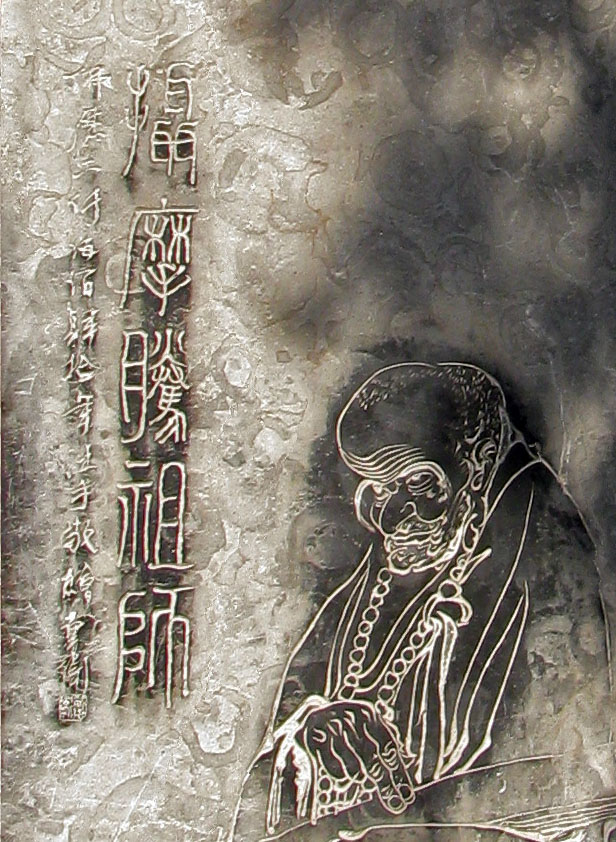
- Tumulus marker of Kāśyapa Mātaṇga located in White Horse Temple, Luoyang, China

Personal life
- Born: unknown Central India
- Died: 73 CE Luoyang, Henan, China
- Notable work: Sutra in Forty-two Sections
- Occupation: Buddhist monk who introduced Buddhism to China, translator from Sanskrit to Chinese

Religious life
- Religion: Buddhism

Kasyapa Matanga

Chinese name
- Traditional Chinese: 迦葉摩騰
- Simplified Chinese: 迦叶摩腾
Transcriptions
Standard Mandarin
- Hanyu Pinyin: Jiā shè mó téng
- Wade–Giles: Chia^{1} she^{4} mo^{2} t’eng^{2}

Sanskrit name
- Sanskrit: काश्यपमातण्ग

Kasyapa Matanga (Kāśyapa Mātaṇga) or Jia Yemoteng 迦葉摩騰 (Jia Shemoteng 迦攝摩騰, Zhu Yemoteng 竺葉摩騰, or Zhu Shemoteng 竺攝摩騰) was an Indian Buddhist monk who is traditionally believed to have first introduced Buddhism to China in the 1st century CE.

According to popular accounts of Chinese Buddhism, Emperor Ming of Han dreamt of a golden deity interpreted as the Buddha and sent a delegation to India. They returned circa 67 CE with the monks Kasyapa Matanga and Dharmaratna, and white horses carrying Buddhist texts and images. The emperor established White Horse Temple in the Han capital Luoyang, where the two supposedly first translated the Sutra of Forty-two Chapters into Chinese.
