= White Horse Temple =

Buddhist temple in Luoyang, China

- 白马寺
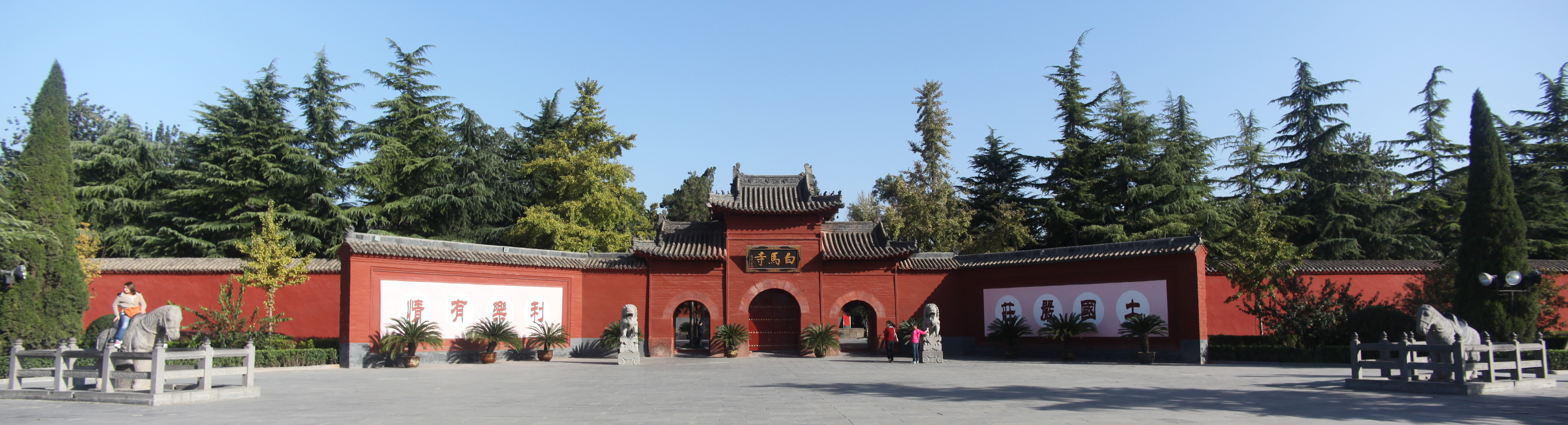
- White Horse Temple

- Location within Henan

Religion
- Affiliation: Buddhism

Location
- Location: Luoyang, Henan
- Country: China
- Coordinates: 34°43′26″N 112°35′59″E

Architecture
- Style: Chinese architecture
- Completed: 68 AD

White Horse Temple
- Traditional Chinese: 白馬寺
- Simplified Chinese: 白马寺
Transcriptions
Standard Mandarin
- Hanyu Pinyin: Báimǎ sì
- IPA: [pǎɪ.mà sɨ̂]
Yue: Cantonese
- Jyutping: Baak^{6}-maa^{5} zi^{6}
- IPA: [pak̚˨ ma˩˧ tsi˨]

White Horse Temple (Chinese: 白馬寺) is a Buddhist temple in Luoyang, Henan that, according to tradition, is the first Buddhist temple in China, having been first established in 68 AD under the patronage of Emperor Ming in the Eastern Han dynasty.

The site is just outside the walls of the ancient Eastern Han capital, some 12–13 kilometres (7.5–8.1 mi) east of Luoyang in Henan Province. It is approximately 40 minutes by bus No. 56 from Luoyang railway station. The temple, although small in comparison to many others in China, is considered by most believers as "the cradle of Chinese Buddhism". The geographical landmarks to the south are Manghan mountain and Lucoche River.

The main temple buildings, a large complex, were reconstructed during the Ming (1368 to 1644) and Qing (1644 to 1912) dynasties. They were refurbished in the 1950s, and again in March 1973 after the Cultural Revolution. It has numerous halls divided by courtyards and manicured gardens, covering an area of about 13 hectares (32 acres). The display plaques in Chinese and English give ample descriptions of the Buddhist deities installed in the halls. Significant statues include Śākyamuni Buddha, Maitreya (the laughing Buddha in China), Amitābha, the Jade Buddha, Bodhisattvas such as Guanyin, and arhats and stone statues of the two white horses which brought the Indian monks to China and two mythical lions at the entrance. Under international funding, the temple has undergone many changes, both structurally and internally. The most recent cooperative project, with India, was completed in 2008 when the Sanchi Stupa and the Sarnath Buddha statue were erected.

== Etymology ==
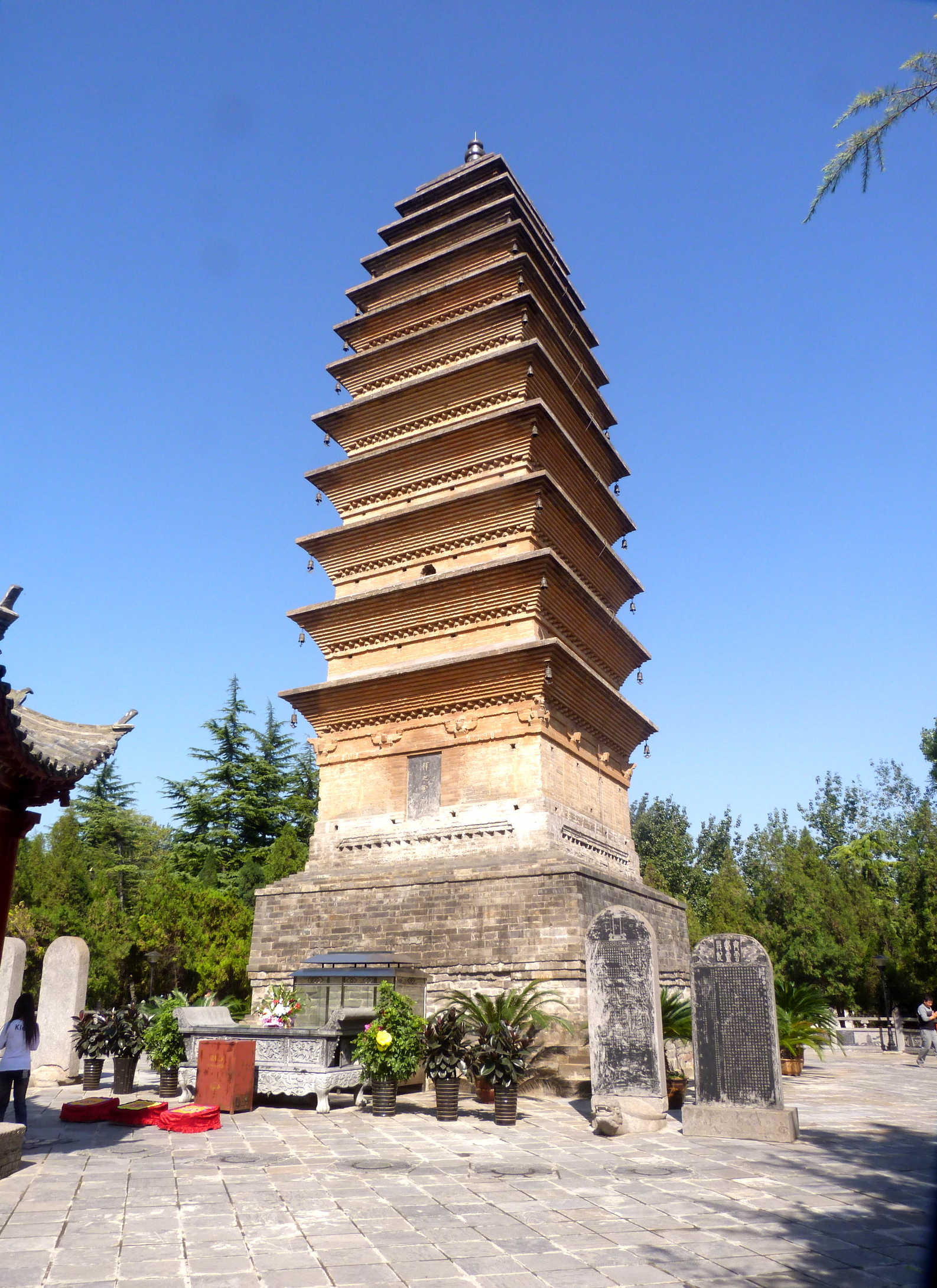
Though destroyed several times in history, the present Qiyun Pagoda was built in 1175

On arrival of the two monks from India, they were housed in the temple. This temple was called the "White Horse Temple" (simplified Chinese: 白马寺; traditional Chinese: 白馬寺; pinyin: Báimǎ sì; Wade–Giles: Pai^{2}-ma^{3} ssu^{4}), where 白 means "white", 马; 馬 means "horse", and 寺 means "shrine, temple, monastery".

Notably, the emperor ordered the suffix 寺 (pinyin: sì) to be used in the temple's name, as a display of respect. This character had been used to denote the ministries of the government. In later periods, all temples, even mosques, came to use this character in their name and it was dropped from the names of government ministries. As a result, the temple's name is sometimes translated as White Horse Ministry, a translation true to the time. White Horse Temple is the modern, literal reading.

However, this may be a folk etymology as there were other early temples in different centres with the same name. The monk Zhidun (or Chih Tun) (314–366), who was a famous propagator of Buddhism in the southern capital is recorded as having discussions with Fenghui at the Baima si (Pai ma) monastery in Jiankang (previously Jianye), the capital of the Eastern Jin (317-420). There was also a Baima si at Xiangyang where Daoan and his disciples stayed c. 365. To further complicate the search for the origin of the name, there were peoples known as the 'White Horse Qiang' and 'Di' who lived in the 'White Horse Valley' on the upper reaches of the Min River, which flows south from the Min Mountains near the town of Zhangla ([Chang-la]: 32.50° N, 103.40° E) and there are still people calling themselves the 'White Horse Di' living there. It is possible, but unprovable, that the name Baima derived from some of these peoples, who may have been influenced by Buddhism at an early period, rather than from literal white horse(s) carrying scriptures.

== Background, legends and importance ==
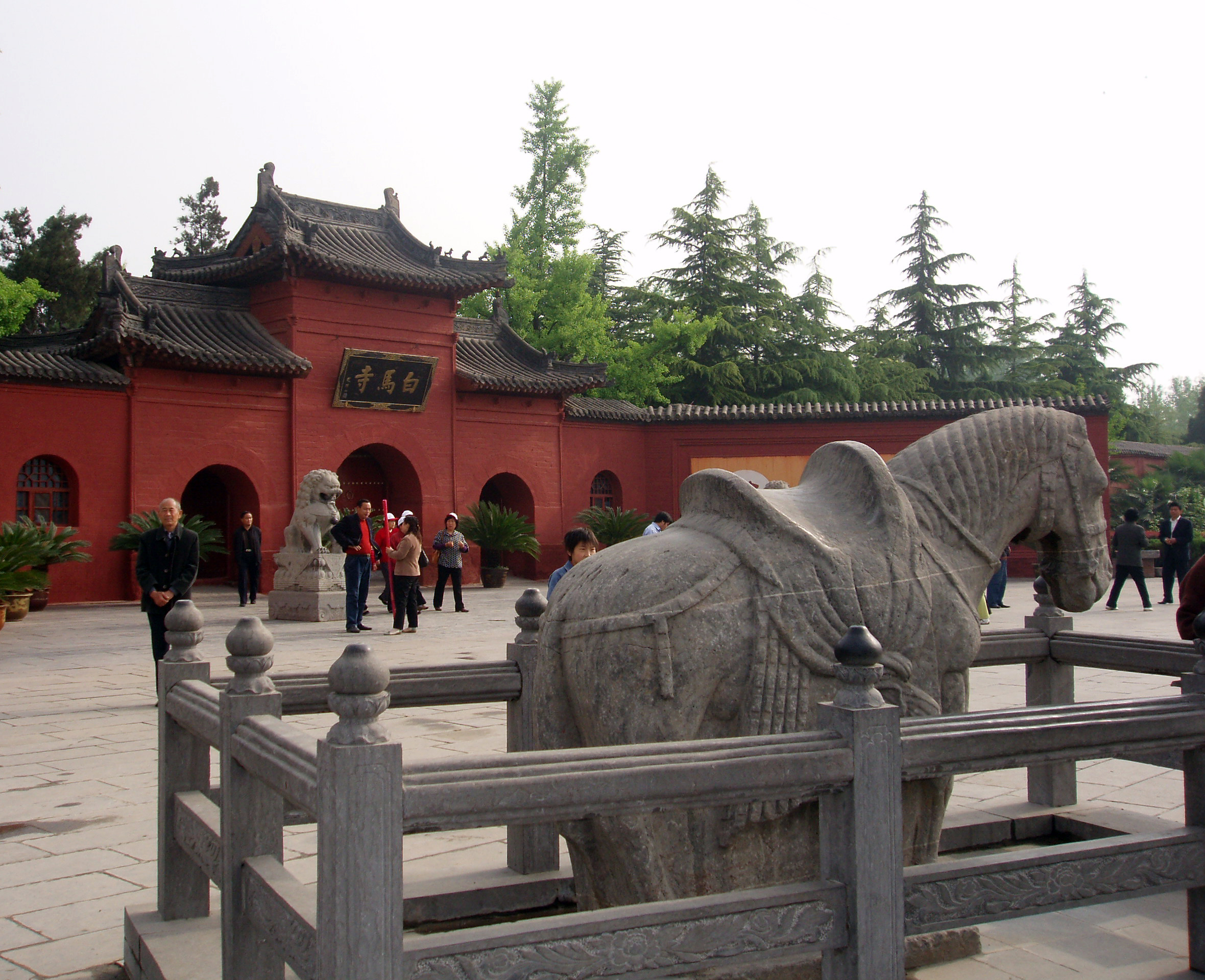
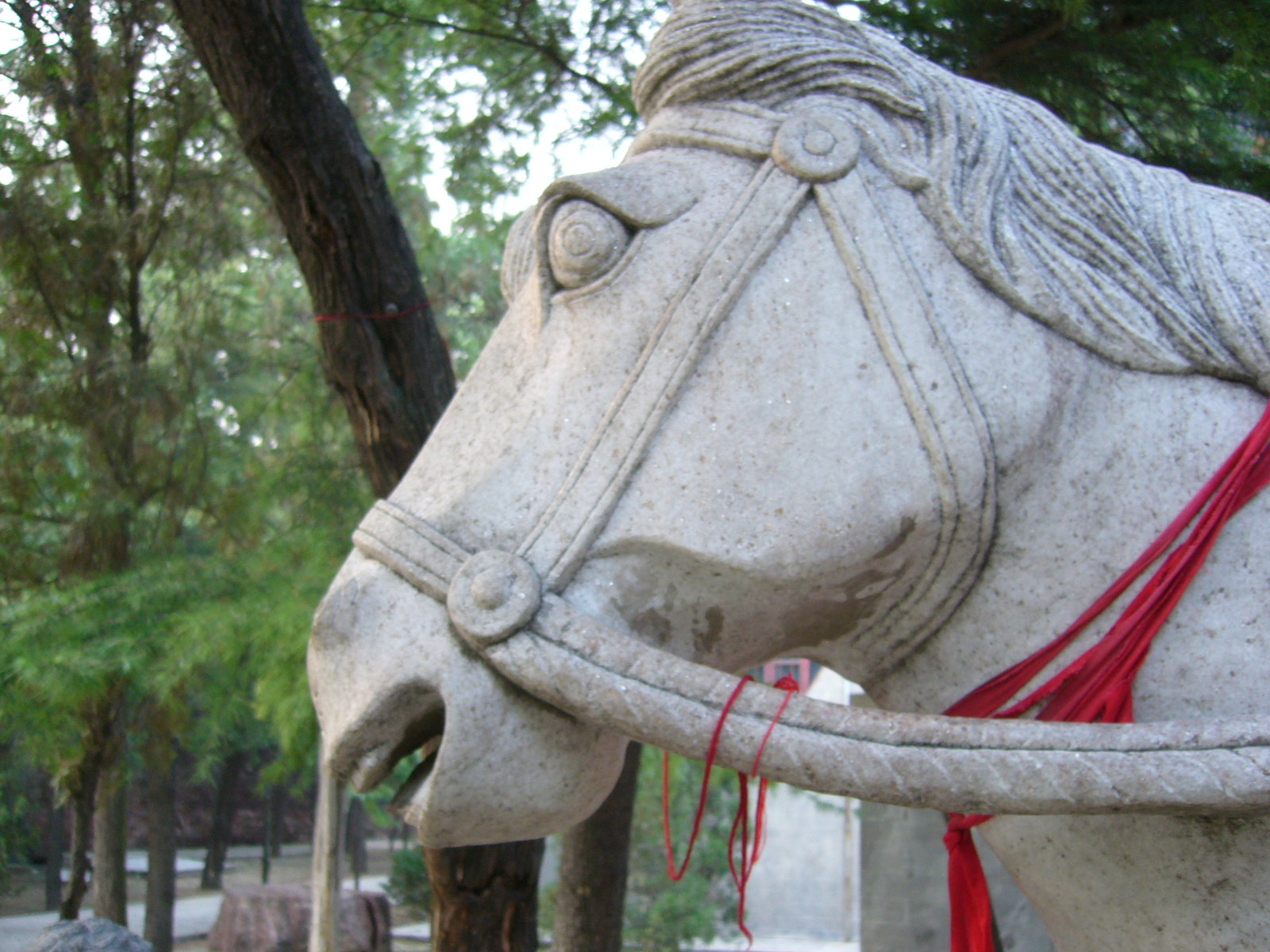
Left: A white horse in an enclosure at the entrance to the White Horse Temple. Right: Horse that brought saints and scriptures to the location at the entrance

Here are several forms of the legends relating to the foundation and naming of the temple:

Following Emperor Ming's dream vision about a Buddha who established Buddhism, two of Ming's emissaries departed to search for Buddhist scriptures. They encountered two Indian Buddhist monks in Central India and persuaded them to join them and return to China, bringing their book of Buddhist scriptures, relics and statues of Buddha with them on two white horses. Pleased with their arrival in China, the king built a temple in their honour and named it the White Horse Temple or Baima Temple, as an appreciation of the white horses that had carried the monks. The monks resided at the new temple and here they translated the Buddhist scriptures into the Chinese language. The Buddhist religion prospered from here and with the arrival of Bodhidarma, another monk from South India in the 5th century, Chinese Buddhism evolved, spreading to other countries.

At the invitation of the Chinese Emperor Ming Di, two Indian monks named Kasyapa Matanga and Dharmaratna or Gobharana, translated the Buddhist classics at the Baima Temple at Luo Yang, which was then the nation's capital. They translated many scriptures, the notable of these was the Sutra of Forty-two Chapters (四十二章經), which was translated by Matanga. This was the first Buddhist sutra in Chinese and has the pride of place in the history of Chinese Buddhism. Gobharana translated the 'Dasa Bhumi' or the 'Ten stages of Perfection', apart from five others. The temple then increased in importance as Buddhism grew within China and spread to Korea, Japan and Vietnam. The introduction of Buddhism in China was a significant influence on Chinese morals, thought and ethics.

The temple's story begins with the dream of Emperor Mingdi and his establishing the temple in 68 AD honouring the two Indian monks and the white horses that brought them to China with Buddhist scriptures. The two monks translated many scriptures while living in the temple, which was named as White Horse Temple. They died in the temple precincts and are buried in the first courtyard of the temple. Following the establishment of the temple, 1000 monks lived here practicing Buddhism.

According to 'The Chapter on the Western Regions' of the Hou Hanshu (Book of Later Han), which was based on a report to the Emperor c. 125, but was not compiled until the 5th century:

"Tradition is that Emperor Ming dreamt that he saw a tall golden man the top of whose head was glowing. He questioned his group of advisers and one of them said: "In the West there is a god called Buddha. His body is sixteen chi tall [3.7 metres (12 ft)], and is the colour of gold." That is why the Emperor sent envoys to Tianzhu [South or Central India] to inquire about the Buddha’s doctrine, after which paintings and statues [of the Buddha] appeared in the Middle Kingdom."

There are differing accounts explaining how the temple was established. Yang Hsüan-chih says in the preface to his book, A Record of the Buddhist Monasteries of Lo-yang (completed c. 547 CE), that, after his dream, Emperor Ming ordered that statues of the Buddha be erected at the [K'ai-]yang Gate (Opening to the Morning Sun Gate) of the Southern Palace and on near the [Ch'ang]yeh Terrace (The Eternal Night Terrace). He, however, makes no mention of the temple.

The Emperor is said to have sent a monk or monks to India or Scythia who returned carrying the Sutra of Forty-two Chapters on a white horse. The Sutra was received by the Emperor and housed in a temple built outside the walls of Luo Yang. It was China's first Buddhist temple.

Other versions mentioned in the book Indian Pandits in the Land of Snow by Sri Sarat Chandra give the following legendary versions:

The legends related to this temple have direct link to the emergence and spread of Buddhism in China. Two visions are stated in this context.

The first vision was witnessed by Chow Wang, the fifth ruler of the Tang dynasty. The Emperor saw, in the southwestern region of China, a very bright light in the sky, like a halo or aureola from the west which lit the whole space. The astrologers of his court predicted that a saint was born in that quarter of the world where he saw the bright halo light. It was also prophesied that the religion practised by the saintly person, would spread to China. This was recorded by the king in his royal register. This year happened to be the year when Gautam Buddha was born in Nepal.

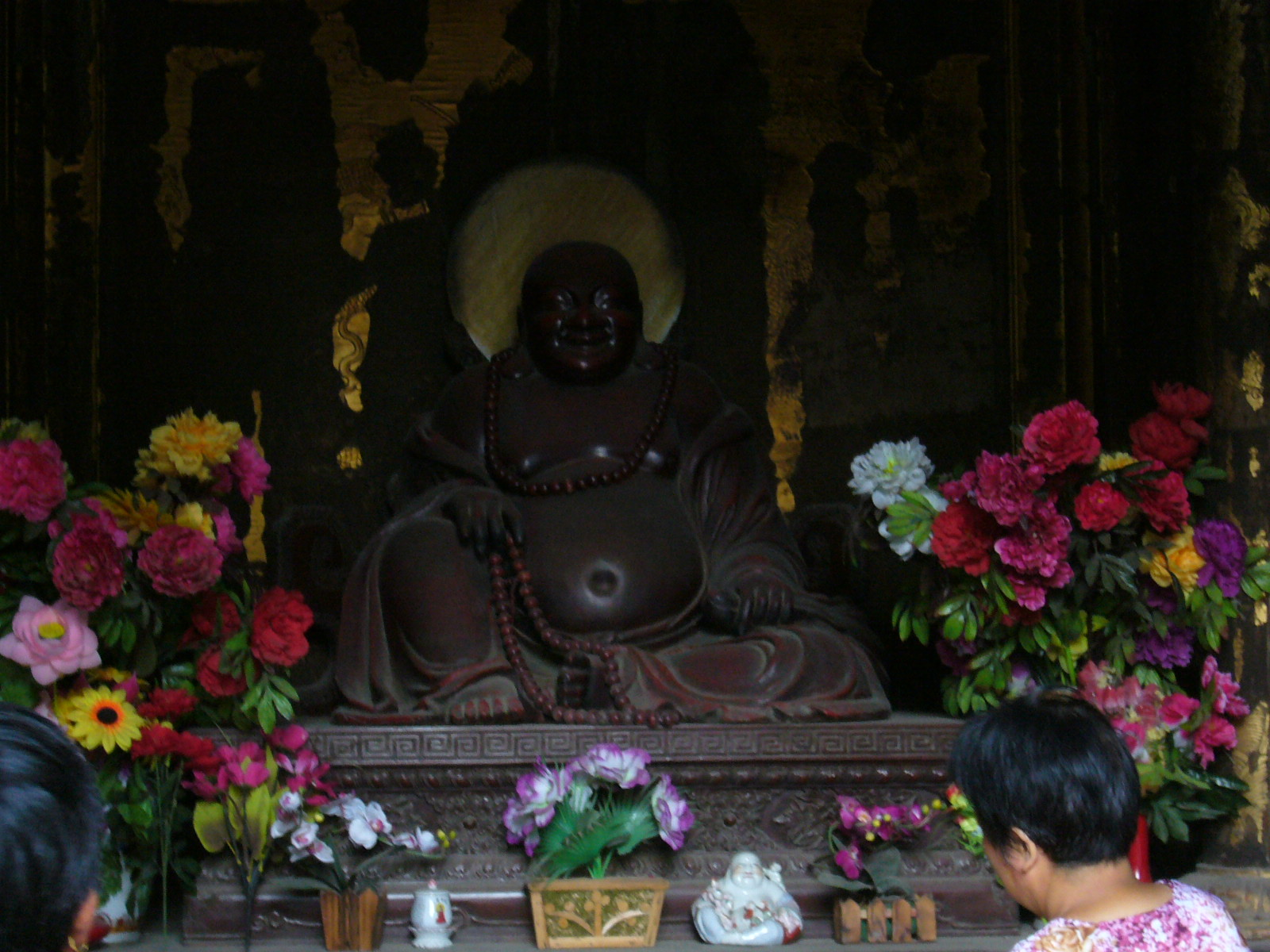
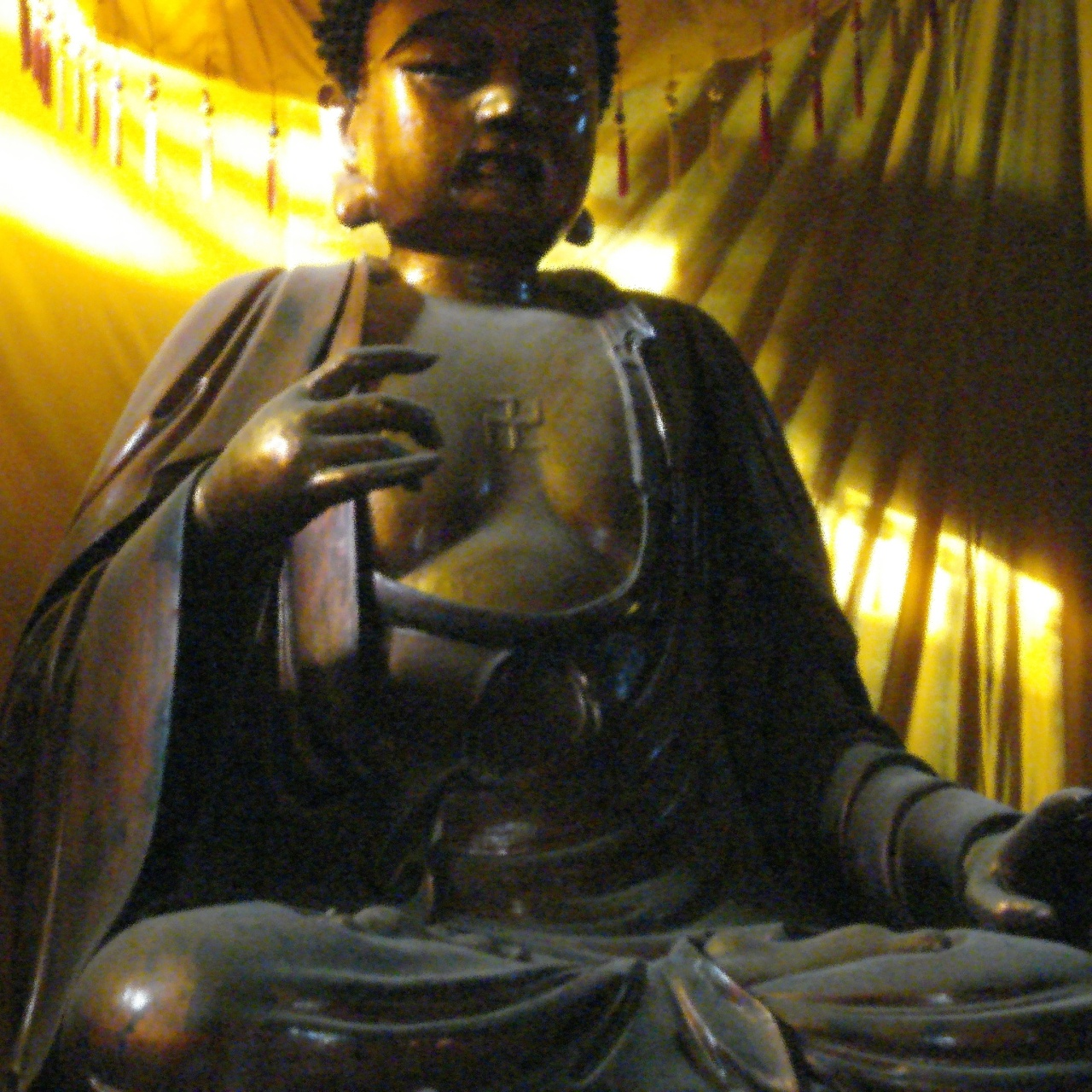
Left: Maitreya statue in the front hall. Right: Sakhyamuni Buddha statue in the main hall

The second vision happened at Luoyang during the reign of Mingdi, the second emperor of the Eastern Han dynasty. In 60 CE, on an auspicious day, the Emperor had a vision (dream) of a saintly person of golden complexion with the Sun and the Moon shining behind his back came near his throne from the heavens and then circled his palace. This incident was correlated with the ancient recorded version and the events were interpreted to mean that the period prophesied in the past, of Buddhism coming to China, was now. History chronicler Fu Hi interpreted this vision as that of the divine person known as Buddha who was born in a place to the west of China in India. Emperor Mingdi forthwith selected emissaries named Taai Yin, Tain King, Wangtrun and others, in all 18 people, to go toward the west to India in search of the religion practiced by Buddha. After travelling through several countries bordering India such as Getse and Yuechi (the Saka Tartars), they reached (Gandhara country) where they met two Buddhist monks (Arhats) named Kasyapa Pandita (a Brahmin from Central India) and Bharana Pandita from South India. They accepted the invitation of the emissaries to go to China. They then proceeded to China on two white horses accompanied by the emissaries. They carried with them a few sacred texts of sutras — the Sutra of Forty-two Chapters — statues of Buddha, portraits and sacred relics. They reached Louyang where they were put up in a temple. The king met them in 67 CE, with due reverence and was pleased with the presents the monks had brought for him. It was the 30th day in the 12th month of Chinese calendar. The Emperor was particularly happy with the Buddha image which had striking similarity to the one he had seen in his dream vision. At this time, the monks performed some miracles, which further strengthened the belief of the Emperor in Buddhism.

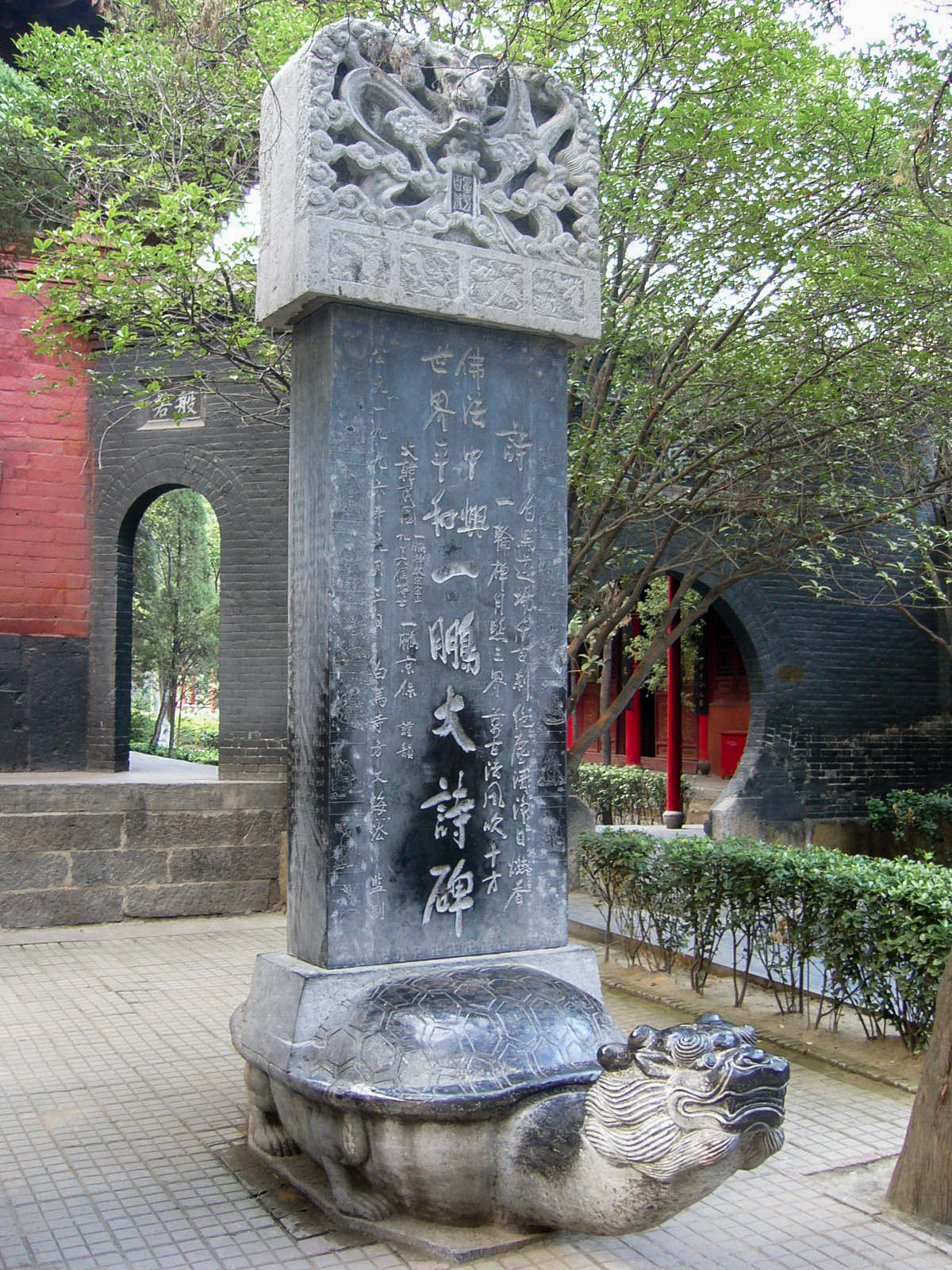
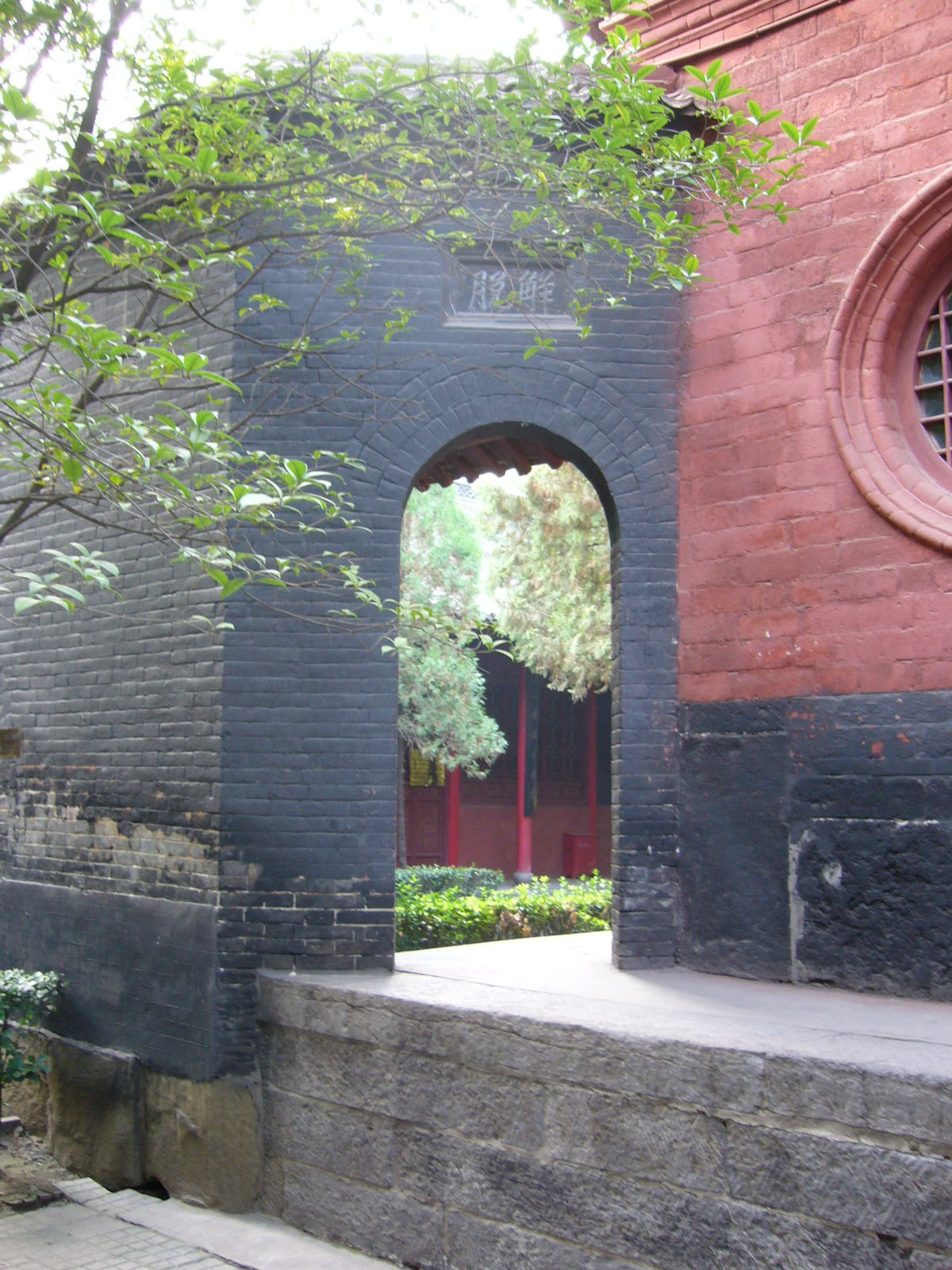
Left: A pillar over a turtle dragon with a message near entrance to temple. Right: Gateway entry into the temple

However, some Taoist priests protested and wanted the Emperor to test the merits of both parties. The Emperor agreed and convened a meeting at the southern gate of the White Horse Temple. He ordered that the sacred texts and religious paraphernalia of the Taoists be placed on the eastern gate and the sacred texts, relics and Buddha image of the westerners in the hall of seven gems on the west. He then ordered that the objects be thrown into the fire, and whichever documents survived the fire then that religion would receive his patronage. The Taoists expected that their texts would survive. This did not happen as all the texts of Taoists were burnt and that of the Buddhists from the west survived. With this test, the Emperor was convinced of the Buddhist religion. He with all his entourage of ministers and kinsmen embraced Buddhism. He built several temples, which included 'Pai-masai', the White Horse Temple and three convents for nuns.

Now that there are many contradictory versions of this story, most modern scholars accept it as a Buddhist fable and not a valid historical event. The White Horse Temple is not recorded in contemporary sources before 289. However, there is a Poma si mentioned in Chang'an in 266 and another of the same name at Jingcheng in central Hubei at about the same date.

It is said that the next year, the Emperor ordered the construction of the White Horse Temple on the south side of the Imperial Drive three li outside the Hsi-yang Gate of the capital Luoyang, to remember the horse that carried back the sutras. After the death of the Emperor a meditation hall was built on his tomb. In front of the stupa luxuriant pomegranate and grape vines were grown which were said to be larger than those elsewhere.

Buddhism evolved in China after arriving from India, as a blend of Chinese beliefs and needs, particularly in respect of its folk heritage. It is Mahayana Buddhism practice, which is widely followed even though the Theravada or Hinayana came to China first.

== History ==
=== Early history ===
In 258 a royal Kuchean monk, Po-Yen, translated six Buddhist texts into Chinese at the temple, including the important Infinite Life Sutra.

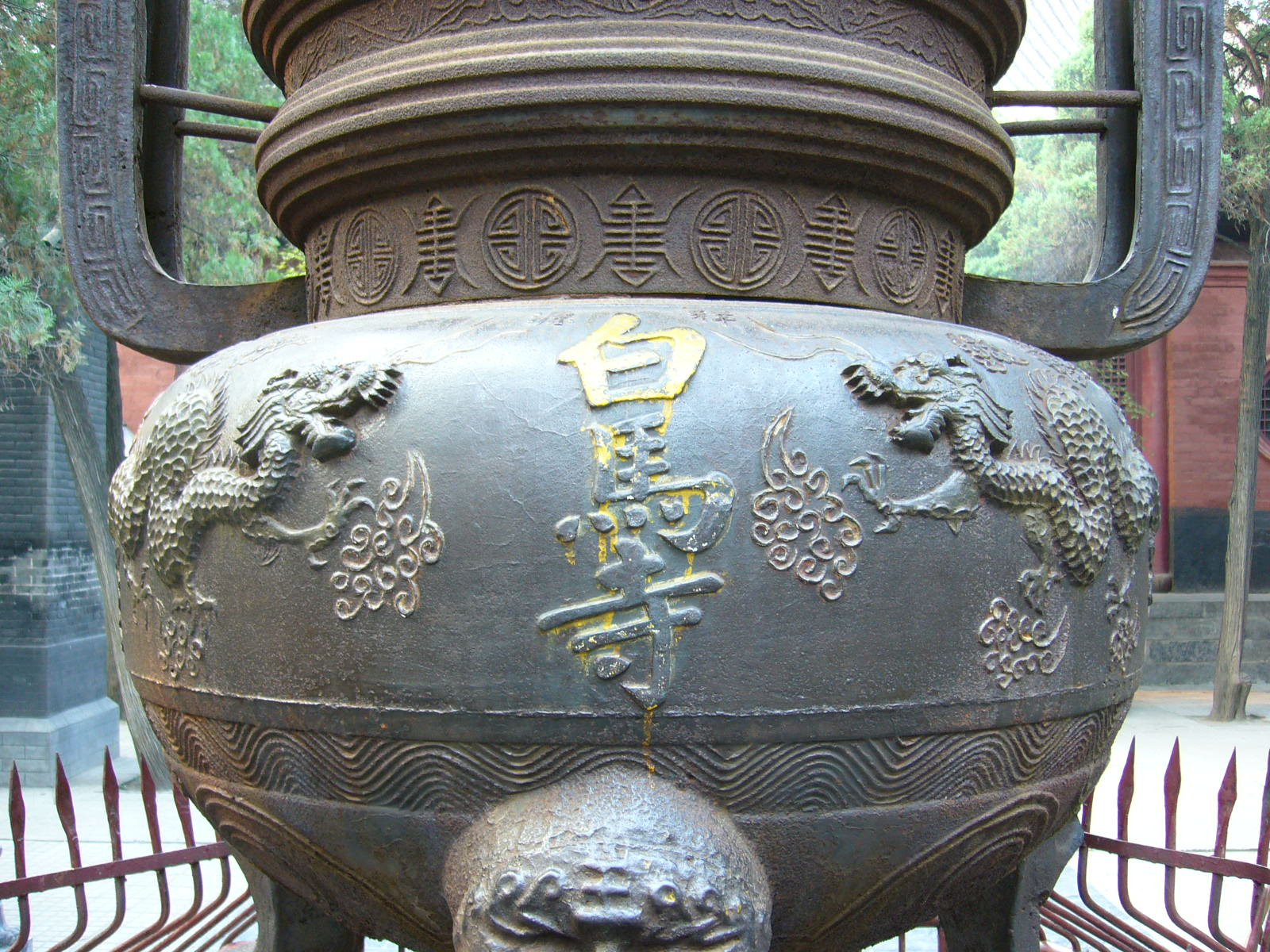
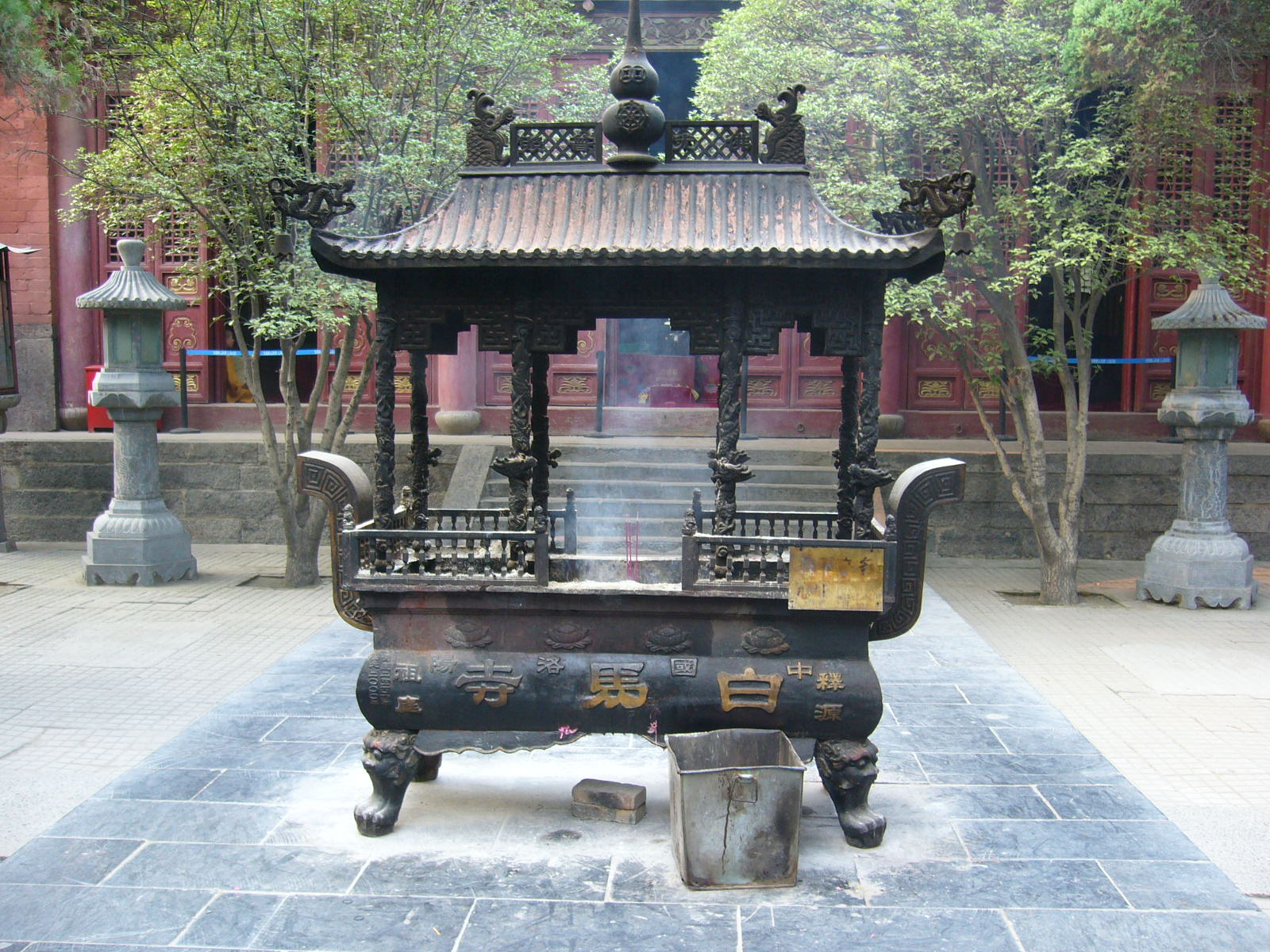
Left: A receptacle to burn incense in front of the main temple. Right: An incense burner just inside the entrance

The famous Indo-Scythian Buddhist translator Dharmarakṣa (Chinese: 竺法護; pinyin: Zhú Fǎhù), active ca. 266–308 CE, came to Luoyang in 266 and resided at the White Horse Temple from at least the spring of 289 to 290 CE.

Furthermore, the renowned monk Xuanzang of the Tang dynasty, who spent 16 years on a pilgrimage to India (630–635 CE) as a result of his desire to visit the Buddha's homeland, started his pilgrimage from this temple. On his return, Xuanzang remained the abbot of the White Horse Temple until his death. During his stay, apart from his teaching duties and other religious activities at the temple, he translated many Buddhist scriptures that he had brought from India, skillfully rendering Sanskrit into Chinese.

In 1175, an inscription on a stone tablet next to Qilun Pagoda—a 35 metres (115 ft) tall, multi-eaved square-based tower to the southeast of the White Horse Temple—stated that a fire occurred five decades previously and destroyed the temple and the Sakya Tathagata sarira stupa, a predecessor to the pagoda. The same inscription of 1175 stated that a Jin official had the stone Qilun Pagoda erected soon after. The pagoda is built with the design style imitating the square-based pagodas of the Tang dynasty.

Between the 13th century and the 20th century, the temple underwent restoration/renovation under the Ming dynasty (1368–1644) and the Qing dynasty (1644–1911). Significant restoration took place in the 16th century and some buildings date to this period, although some have since been renovated.

=== Modern history ===
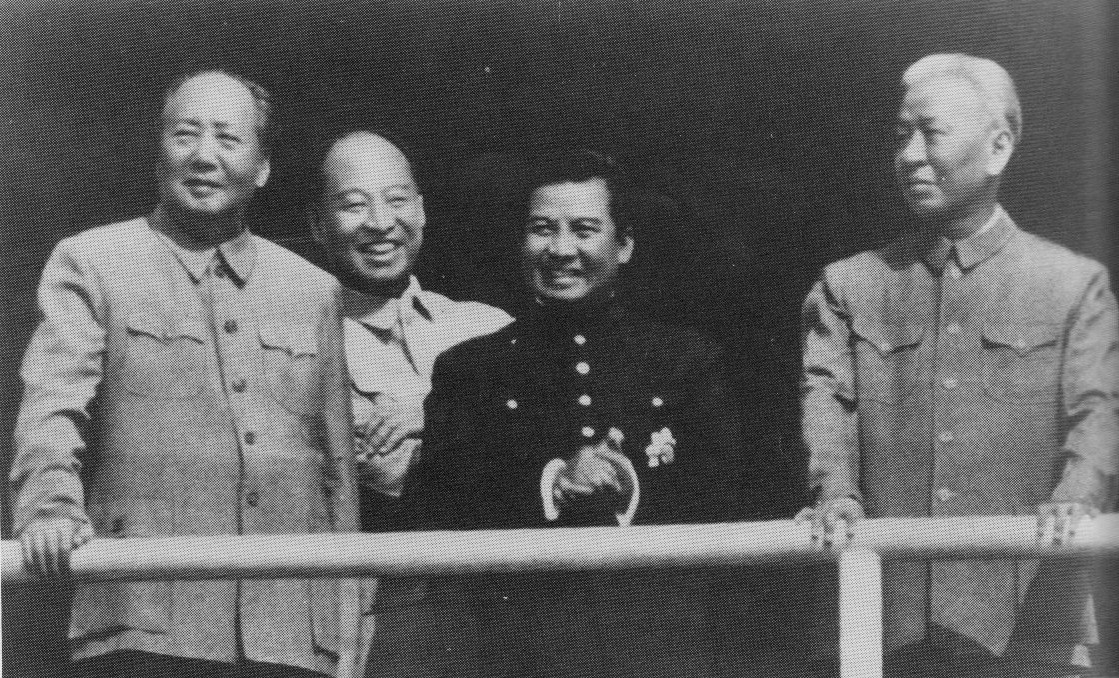
Norodom Sihanouk of Cambodia (centre) in China

Under the People's Republic of China, the temple has seen many renovations in the period between 1952 and 1973 following the Cultural Revolution. The Cultural Revolution had left the temple ravaged and emptied of relics, with many buildings burnt down.

In 1973, Prince Norodom Sihanouk of Cambodia visited the temple. Cambodia was a communist ally of China and Prince Sihanouk was staying in a palatial residence in Beijing. He was permitted to visit parts of the country on a tour for propaganda purposes, to show to the outside world that all was normal within China. As an ardent Buddhist, Sihanouk expressed a wish to Premier Zhou Enlai to visit the White Horse Temple. This put the administration into a frenzy, since many parts of the temple had been damaged during the Cultural Revolution and items were missing. Post haste, 2900 artefacts, which were in other palaces and museums in China, such as the Palace of Benevolent Tranquillity on the western side of the Forbidden City and statues in the Arhat Hall (Luohan Tang) of the Temple of Azure Clouds in Beijing's Fragrant Hills were secretly shifted to the temple, and the White Horse Temple was fully restored. The newly restored temple impressed the Cambodians, who were oblivious to the events that had gutted the temple. The shift of artefacts to this temple was announced as permanent by Premier Zhou Enlai when the original owners wanted the artefacts to be returned.

In 1992, with the assistance of Thai and Chinese donors, the Hall of the Thai Buddha was constructed slightly west of the old temple.

==== India-China cultural cooperation ====
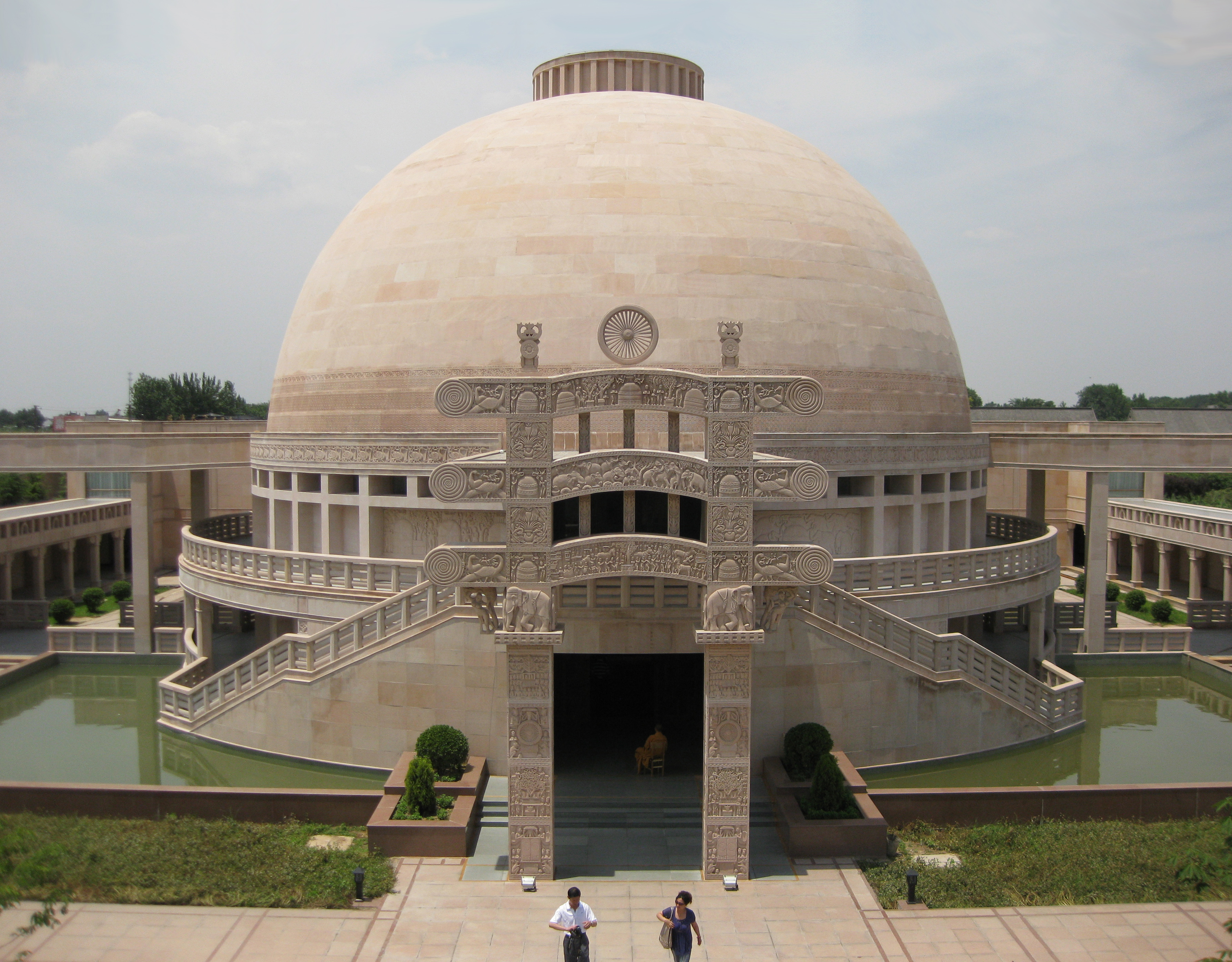
Indian-style Buddhist Temple in Luoyang, China

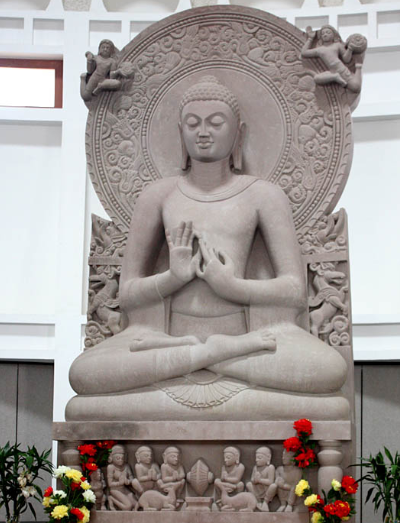
Dharmachakra Pravartana Buddha at Sarnath

The symbolic importance of the temple for the ancient cultural relations between China and India was demonstrated when the Prime Minister of India P.V. Narasimha Rao visited the temple in 1993. A decade later, in 2003, Prime Minister Atal Bihari Vajpayee also visited the temple.

To enhance the Buddhist cultural links between India and China, a memorandum of understanding (MOU) was signed on 11 April 2005. It stipulated that India would build an Indian-style Buddhist temple to the west side of the White Horse Temple, in the International Garden of the complex. Under this agreement, India was to provide the architectural design, material for construction, the Buddha statue, landscaping and technical advice from architects and experts during construction. Chinese authorities were to allot a piece of land of 2,666.67 square metres (28,703.8 ft^{2}).

Following the MOU, a Buddhist shrine that is a close replica of the Sanchi Stupa was completed in 2008. Its presence in the precincts of China's first temple was inspired by Buddhist saints from India. The architectural features of the new temple closely recreate those of Sanchi's Stupa, including Sanchi's east gate. An image of the Buddha was transported from India and consecrated in the new temple, in conformity with the Indian Buddhist tradition. It is worth noticing that this temple was built on land donated by the Chinese government. The shrine is a two-storied structure with circular walls on both floors. Its circular walls are embellished with murals of scenes from the Jataka tales and the life of Buddha. The temple was executed in close co-ordination with the Indian design experts selected for the project, and Architects Akshaya Jain & Kshitij Jain made several visits to the site in relation with their work as consultants.

The Buddha statue was designed following the pattern of the 5th-century image of the Buddha kept at Sarnath, and it has been consecrated in the temple's central congressional hall. The president of India, Pratibha Patil, inaugurated this temple on May 27, 2010. The new temple incorporates features from the most revered Indian Buddhist shrines of Sanchi and Sarnath.

== Architecture ==
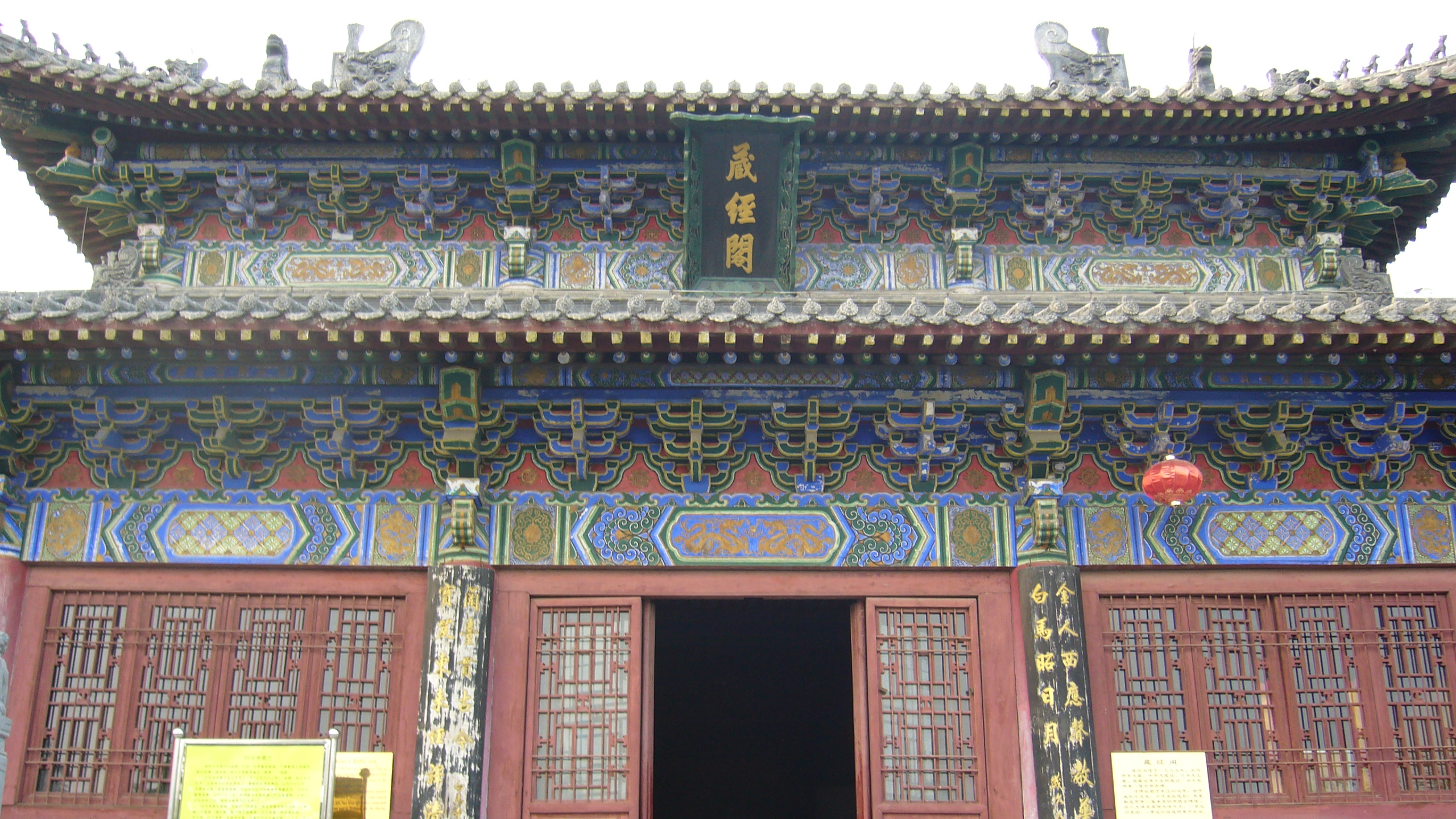
Left: Entrance arch with mythical lions. A small tower in front of the main temple to light incense. Right: The main temple roof line

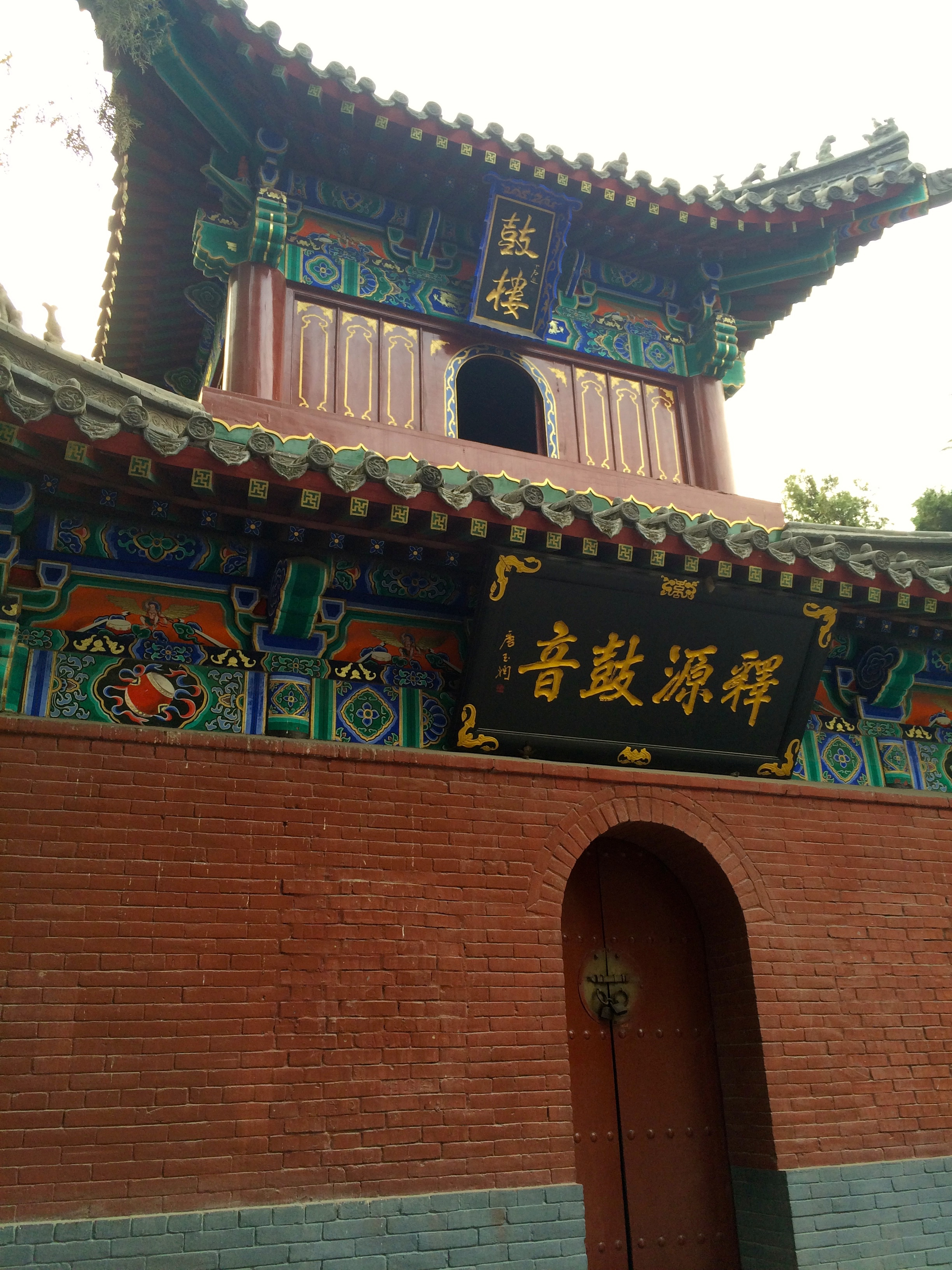
The Drum Tower

The temple faces south and is aligned along a central axis starting from the entrance gate followed by several halls and courtyards in succession. The temple compound covers an area of 200 mu (13 hectares (32 acres)) and faces south. A stone paifang (archway), a three-door covered archway, has been recently built, 150 metres (490 ft) in front of the original gate. The stone horses at the front of the temple are in the Ming architectural style, representing the white horses which carried the scriptures and the Indian monks to China. Between the archway and gate lies a pool with fountains, crossed by three stone bridges. The two horses at the entrance gate facing each other are made of green stone dated to the Song dynasty (960–1279).

Entering the temple today, plaques (in English and Chinese) and signposts are seen, which guide the visitors and pilgrims through the halls. The plaques briefly explain the statues in each hall. The halls are discerned in the inscriptions on the plaques, include the 'Hall of Greetings', 'Hall of Six Founders', 'Hall of jade Buddha', the 'Hall of Heavenly Kings', Hall of Mahavira and Hall of Changing Ge (repository of ancient scriptures).

In addition, the 'Cool and Clear Terrace' known as the 'Qingliang Terrace' is behind the main hall, the place where the original sutras were translated. This terrace is amidst bamboo forest of old pine trees and has halls which are interconnected. Four sides of the terrace are piled with green bricks. The central building of the terrace is the Vairocana Pavilion, which was originally constructed during the Han dynasty. The present building dates back to the Ming dynasty and was built with a xieshan style roof with double eaves. The pavilion principally enshrines statues of Vairocana Buddha and the Bodhisattvas Manjushri and Samantabhadra. In addition, a total of 5,050 wood-carved Buddha statues, made with incense ash, are enshrined on both sides of the pavilion. The terrace also has the Kunlu Pavilion with halls on its east and west that house the statues of the two eminent monks, She Moteng and Zhu Falan. They were buried inside the temple gate after they died here; the Bell Tower and the Drum Tower, in front of their tombs, were once prominent sights of Luoyang City.

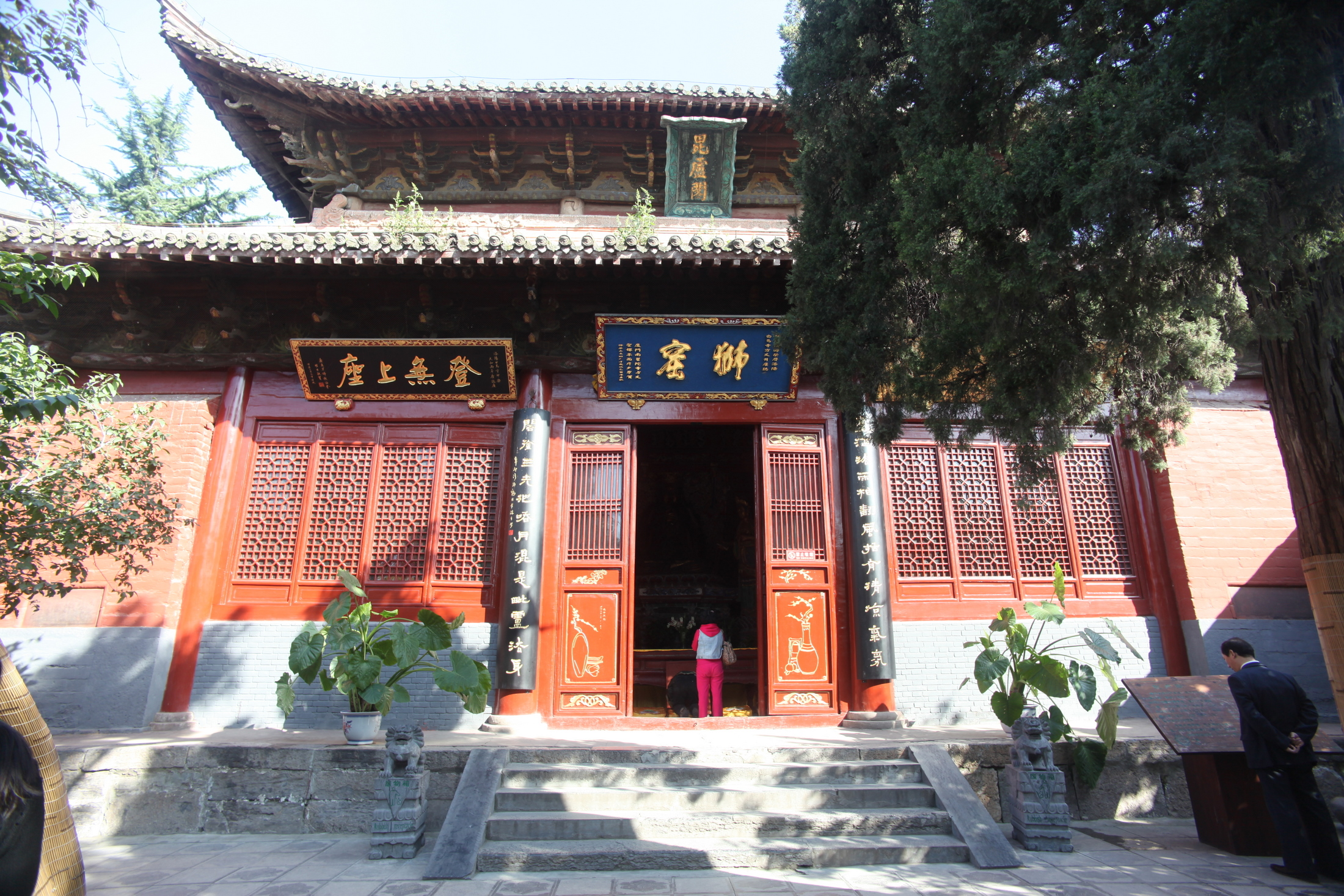
The Pilu Library

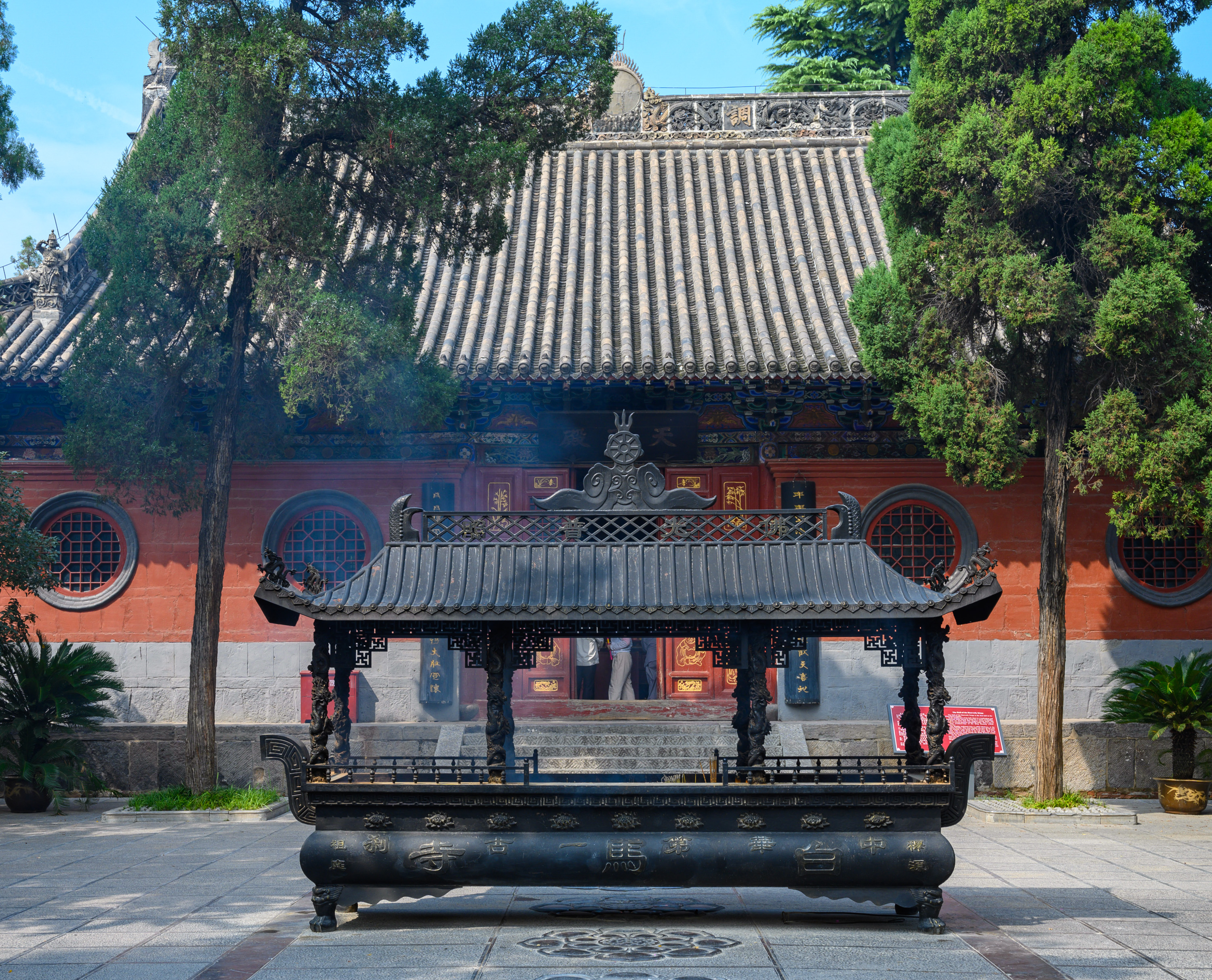
The Hall of Heavenly Kings

In the courtyard, large burners are kept for worshipers to light incense sticks, creating a pungent odour. In the Main hall and other halls where images are worshiped, the altars are filled with fruit and other offerings made by the devotees. Multicoloured tapestry hang from the ceilings of the halls and lighted candles float in the basins, presenting a divine spiritual setting.

The smallest hall is known as the "Hall of greetings". It is a relatively new building that was built during the 9th year of Guangho period as replacement to the original hall which was burned down at the beginning of the Tonghzi period. This hall has deified statues of The Three Noble Ones of the West from Pure Land Buddhism: Amitabha, the founder, is at the centre and is flanked by Guanyin on the left and Mahasthamaprapta on the right.

The founders of the temple whose statues are worshiped in the 'Hall of Six Founders' belonged to the sect of Chan. The names of the founders as displayed in the order of their succession: Bodidharma, the first founder who hailed from ancient India where he was the 28th generation patriarch preaching the Buddhist philosophy; the second was Huike; the third founder was Sengcan; the fourth was Daoxn, the fifth founder was Hongren; and the sixth was Huineng. Subsequent to Huineng, five schools of Buddhism and Seven Orders were established.

In the "Hall of the Jade Buddha," stands an image of the Sakyamuni Buddha. The 1.6 metres (5.2 ft) tall image made in jade was donated in 1988 by a Chinese man who had settled in Burma. This elegantly sculpted and cherished statue has a precious stone embedded in its forehead. Before it was shifted to this temple in 1992, it had been stored in the Pilu pavilion.

The first large hall in the temple complex is known as "The Hall of Heavenly Kings," where a statue of the Maitreya, known in China as the laughing Buddha, is the main deity located in the hall's front. This statue is flanked on the eastern and western sides by four heavenly kings, each representing one fourth of the universe. The eastern side is ruled by Chigua (guardian of the State) carrying a Pipa, the western side is controlled by Guangmu (Sharp-seer) with a dragon in his hand, the southern direction is represented by Zengzhang (Growth Protector), carrying an umbrella and the northern direction is represented by Duowen (Knowledge Preserver), carrying a Pagoda. In addition, there is a statue of Wei Tuo (a high ranking heavenly general and defender of Buddhist law) at the rear of the Maitreya statue.

The Hall of Changing Ge, built in 1995, is a repository of ancient scriptures, which has more than ten types of Buddhist texts, including the Longzang Jing Dazong Jing, the Dazeng Zong Jing, the Tibet Jing and so forth. An ancient Buddha statue of China is installed at the centre of the repository. The making of this Buddha statue is traced to the Eastern Han dynasty. The statue was misplaced at the early 20th century. However, it was later found in Thailand and was replicated in bronze into two 97 centimetres (38 in) tall statues and then gilded. One of these is deified in the library and the other was sent to Thailand.

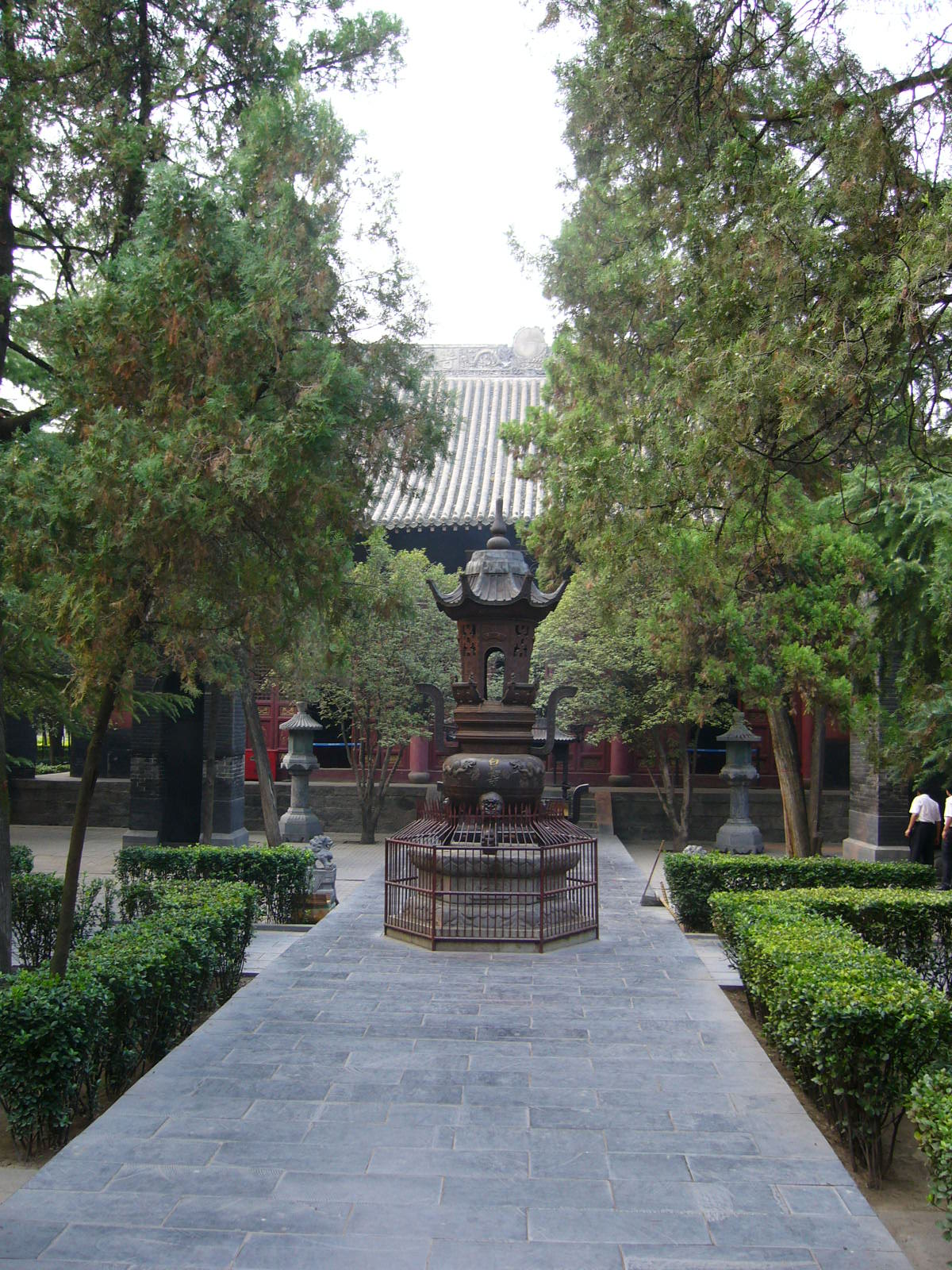
A tower in front of the main temple to light incense

The Mahavira Hall enshrines the statues of three principal Buddhas. The central image is of the Sakyamuni Buddha. This statue is flanked on the left by Bhaisajyaguru and on the right by Amitabha; these in turn are flanked by two heavenly generals named Wei Tuo and Wei Li. Statues of the Eighteen Arhats adorn the side of the hall. All the statues were made in ramie-cloth during the Yuan dynasty. The walls on both sides are adorned with carvings of ten thousand Buddhists. A statue of Jialan is installed facing north of the backdoor.

In the Main Hall, at the altar, there are three statues, the central statue is that of Sakhyamuni Buddha flanked by statue of Manjushri and Samantabhadra. There is a very large bell weighing more than 1 tonne (a figure of 2.5 tonnes is also mentioned), installed during the reign of the Jiajing Emperor of the Ming dynasty, near the altar, which is struck in time during the chanting of prayers by the monks. A community of ten thousand monks resided here during the Tang dynasty. The inscription on the bell reads: "The sound of the Bell resounds in Buddha's temple causing the ghosts in Hell to tremble with fear."

The living quarters of the monks are in an exclusive pagoda, with restricted entry, called the "Qiyun Ta," or Qiyun Pagoda. It is approachable after crossing the manicured garden and a bridge to the left of the main temple. This pagoda was built in the 12th century in the fifteenth year of the Dading reign of the Jin dynasty (1115–1234). It is a 13 tiered, 25 metres (82 ft)), high cubic shaped brick tower. It has been renovated in subsequent periods. The tomb of the famous Tang dynasty official Di Renjie is also located in the eastern end of the complex.

Although the temple is open to the public, visitors are closely monitored for security purposes. While the chief abbot stays informed about the country's political situation through a TV installed in his room, monks dwelling in this facility are required to carry an identification card at all times.

== Cultural relics ==
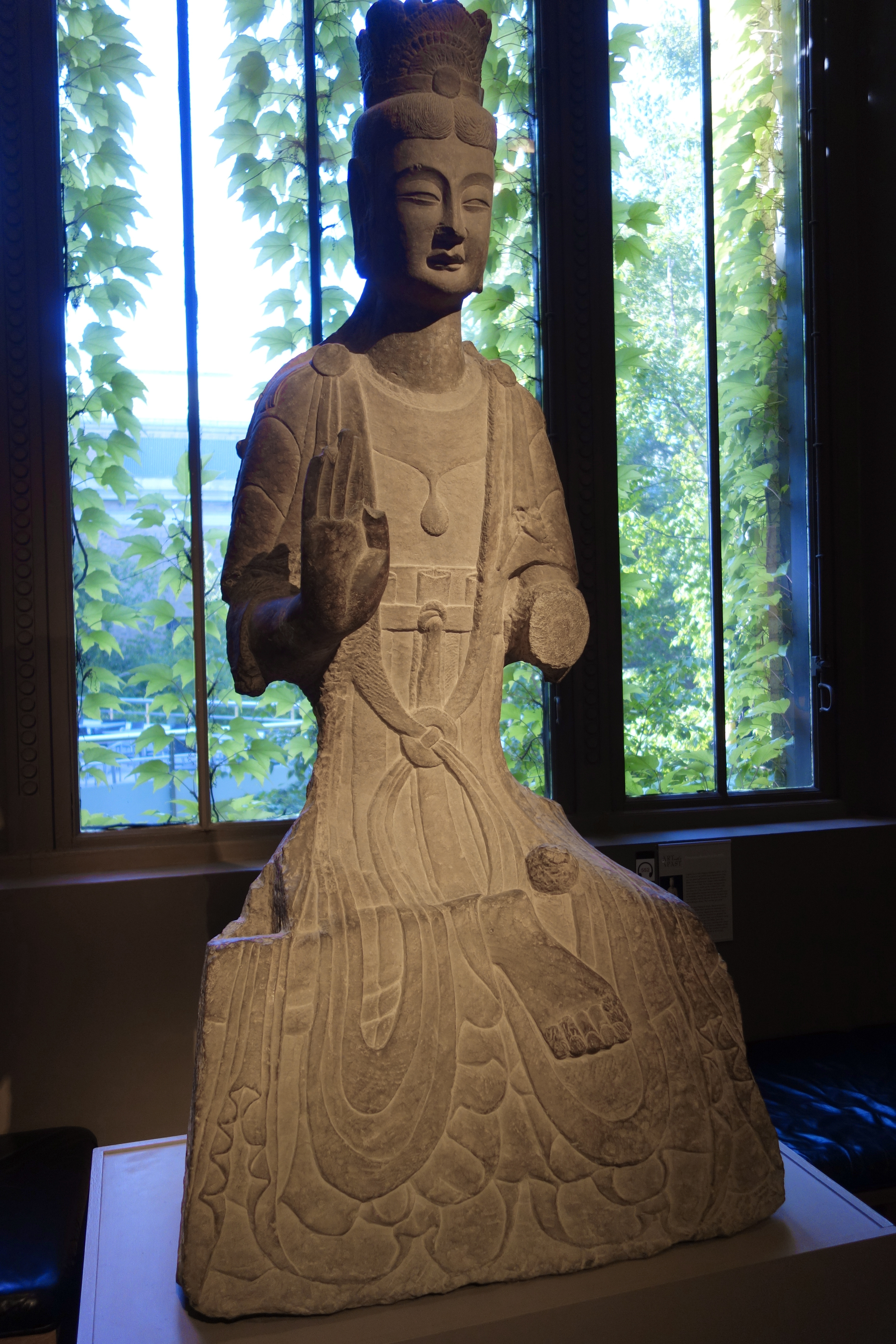
Statue of Maitreya.

=== Statue of Maitreya ===
A stone statue of Maitreya, which was made in the 6th century, was stolen and lost to the United States, now it is preserved at the Museum of Fine Arts, Boston.

== Peony Festival ==
Peony Festival (mudan huahui) is an important flower festival, which is held in Luoyang every year on April 10–25 and which attracts large crowds to the city and the White Horse Temple. The legend linked to this festival is that peony flower did not follow the orders of the queen Empress Wu of the Tang dynasty to bloom during winter and she became enraged that it did not obey her command. As a result, she ordered that peony flowers be banished from Xi'an to Luoyang. It is this banishment which is celebrated as the Peony Festival in Luoyang.

== See also ==
- Chinese Buddhism
- Horse in Chinese mythology

== Bibliography ==
- Cummings, Joe et al. (1991). China — A Travel Survival Kit. 3rd Edition. Lonely Planet Publications. Hawthorne, Vic., Australia. ISBN 0-86442-123-0.
- Elmer, David, et al. (2009). China (Country Guide) 11th Revised Edition. Lonely Planet. ISBN 978-1-74104-866-7.
- Hill, John E. (2009). Through the Jade Gate to Rome: A Study of the Silk Routes during the Later Han Dynasty, 1st to 2nd Centuries CE. BookSurge, Charleston, South Carolina. ISBN 978-1-4392-2134-1.
- Leffman, David, Simon Lewis and Jeremy Atiyah. (2005). The Rough Guide to China. Fourth Edition. Rough Guides, New York, London and Delhi. ISBN 978-1-84353-479-2.
- Maspero, M. H. (1901). Le songe et l’ambassade de le’empereur Ming. BEFEO, X (1901), pp. 95–130 + Correspondence from M. le Commandant Harfeld and reply from Maspero, pp. 282–283.
- Pelliot, Paul (1920). Meou-tseu ou les doutes levés. Translated and annotated by Paul Pelliot. T’oung pao, 19 (1920), pp. 255–433.
- Yang, Hsüan-chih. (1984). A Record of Buddhist Monasteries in Lo-yang. Translated by Yi-t'ung Wang. Princeton University Press, Princeton, New Jersey. ISBN 0-691-05403-7.
- Zürcher, E. (1972). The Buddhist Conquest of China: The Spread and Adaptation of Buddhism in Early Medieval China. 2nd Edition (reprint with additions and corrections). Leiden. E. J. Brill. Firs Edition 1952.
