= Han dynasty =

Imperial dynasty in China (202 BC – 220 AD)

Han 漢
- 202 BC – 9 AD; 25–220 AD; (9–23 AD: Xin)
- The Western Han dynasty in 2 AD: Principalities and centrally-administered commanderies; Protectorate of the Western Regions (Tarim Basin)
- Capital: Chang'an (206 BC – 9 AD, 190–195 AD); Luoyang (23–190 AD, 196 AD); Xuchang (196–220 AD)
- Common languages: Old Chinese
- Religion: Chinese folk religion; Taoism; Buddhism
- Government: Monarchy
- Emperor
  - 202–195 BC (first): Emperor Gaozu
  - 141–87 BC: Emperor Wu
  - 74–48 BC: Emperor Xuan
  - 25–57 AD: Emperor Guangwu
  - 189–220 AD (last): Emperor Xian
- Chancellor
  - 206–193 BC: Xiao He
  - 193–190 BC: Cao Shen
  - 189–192 AD: Dong Zhuo
  - 208–220 AD: Cao Cao
  - 220 AD: Cao Pi
- Historical era: Imperial
  - Xiang Yu appointed Liu Bang as King of Han: 206 BC
  - Battle of Gaixia; Liu Bang proclaimed emperor: 202 BC
  - Xin dynasty: 9–23 AD
  - Abdication to Cao Wei: 220 AD

Area
- 50 BC (est. Western Han peak): 6,000,000 km^{2} (2,300,000 sq mi)
- 100 AD (est. Eastern Han peak): 6,500,000 km^{2} (2,500,000 sq mi)

Population
  - 2 AD: 57,671,400
- Currency: Ban Liang coins; Wu Zhu coins
Preceded by
Qin dynasty
Eighteen Kingdoms
Ailao Kingdom
Dian kingdom
Succeeded by
Cao Wei
Shu Han
Eastern Wu

Chinese name
- Traditional Chinese: 漢
- Simplified Chinese: 汉
Transcriptions
Standard Mandarin
- Hanyu Pinyin: Hàn
- Bopomofo: ㄏㄢˋ
- Gwoyeu Romatzyh: Hann
- Wade–Giles: Han^{4}
- Tongyong Pinyin: Hàn
- Yale Romanization: Hàn
- IPA: [xân]
Wu
- Romanization: Hoe
Yue: Cantonese
- Yale Romanization: Hon
- Jyutping: Hon3
- IPA: [hɔn˧]
Southern Min
- Hokkien POJ: Hàn
- Tâi-lô: Hàn
Middle Chinese
- Middle Chinese: xàn
Old Chinese
- Baxter (1992): *xans
- Baxter–Sagart (2014): *n̥ˤar-s

The Han dynasty (202 BC – 9 AD, 25–220 AD) was an imperial dynasty of China established by Liu Bang, and preceded by the short-lived Qin dynasty (221–206 BC) and the interregnum known as the Chu–Han Contention (206–202 BC). It was succeeded by the Three Kingdoms period (220–280 AD) and also briefly interrupted by the Xin dynasty (9–23 AD) established by the usurping regent Wang Mang. It is thus separated into two periods—the Western Han (202 BC – 9 AD) and the Eastern Han (25–220 AD). The Han dynasty is considered a golden age in Chinese history, impacting Chinese identity in later periods. The majority ethnic group of modern China refer to themselves as the "Han people", while spoken Chinese and written Chinese are referred to respectively as the "Han language" and "Han characters".

The Han emperor was at the pinnacle of Han society and culture. He presided over the Han government but shared power with both the nobility and the appointed ministers, who came largely from the scholarly gentry class. The Han Empire was divided into commanderies directly controlled by the central government and also semi-autonomous kingdoms. These kingdoms gradually lost their autonomy, particularly following the Rebellion of the Seven States. From the reign of Emperor Wu (r. 141–87 BC) onward, the Chinese court officially sponsored Confucianism in education and court politics, synthesizing it with the cosmology of Dong Zhongshu. The Han dynasty experienced periods of economic prosperity as well as significant growth in the money economy, which had first been established during the Zhou dynasty (c. 1050–256 BC). The coinage minted by the central government in 119 BC remained the standard in China until the Tang dynasty (618–907 AD). To finance its military campaigns and settlement of newly conquered frontier territories, the Han government nationalized private salt and iron industries in 117 BC, creating government monopolies that were later repealed during the Eastern Han period. There were significant advances in science and technology during the Han period, including the invention of papermaking, rudders for steering ships, negative numbers in mathematics, raised-relief maps, hydraulic-powered armillary spheres for astronomy, and seismometers that discerned the cardinal direction of distant earthquakes by use of inverted pendulums.

The Han dynasty had many conflicts with the Xiongnu, a nomadic confederation centred in the eastern Eurasian steppe. The Xiongnu defeated the Han in 200 BC, prompting the Han to appease the Xiongnu with a policy of marriage alliance and payments of tribute, though the Xiongnu continued to raid Han China's northern borders. Han policy changed in 133 BC when Emperor Wu began a series of military campaigns to quell the Xiongnu. Han forces cleaved the Hexi Corridor and Inner Asian territory of the Tarim Basin away from the Xiongnu, helping to establish the Silk Road trade route. The Xiongnu were eventually defeated and forced to accept a status as Han vassals, though the lands north of the Han's borders were later overrun by the nomadic Xianbei confederation. Emperor Wu also launched successful conquests in the south, annexing Nanyue in 111 BC and Dian in 109 BC. He further expanded Han territory into the northern Korean Peninsula, where Han forces conquered Gojoseon and established the Xuantu and Lelang commanderies in 108 BC.

After 92 AD, palace eunuchs increasingly involved themselves in the dynasty's court politics, engaging in violent power struggles between various consort clans of the empresses and empresses dowager. Imperial authority was also seriously challenged by large Taoist religious societies which instigated the Yellow Turban Rebellion and the Five Pecks of Rice Rebellion. Following the death of Emperor Ling (r. 168–189 AD), the palace eunuchs were massacred by military officers, allowing members of the aristocracy and military governors to become warlords and divide the empire. The Han dynasty came to an end in 220 AD when Cao Pi, king of Wei, usurped the throne from Emperor Xian.

== Etymology ==
According to the Shiji, after the collapse of the Qin dynasty the hegemon Xiang Yu appointed Liu Bang as prince of the small fief of Hanzhong, named after its location on the Han River (in modern southwest Shaanxi). Following Liu Bang's victory in the Chu–Han Contention, the resulting Han dynasty was named after the Hanzhong fief. The Chinese character Han (漢) was also an ancient name for the Milky Way or "Sky River".

== History ==
=== Western Han (202 BC – 9 AD) ===
China's first imperial dynasty was the Qin dynasty (221–206 BC). The Qin united the Chinese Warring States by conquest, but their regime became unstable after the death of the first emperor Qin Shi Huang. Within four years, the dynasty's authority had collapsed in a rebellion. Two former rebel leaders, Xiang Yu (d. 202 BC) of Chu and Liu Bang (d. 195 BC) of Han, engaged in a war to determine who would have hegemony over China, which had fissured into Eighteen Kingdoms, each claiming allegiance to either Xiang Yu or Liu Bang. Although Xiang Yu proved to be an effective commander, Liu Bang defeated him at the Battle of Gaixia (202 BC) in modern-day Anhui. Liu Bang assumed the title of Emperor at the urging of his followers and is known posthumously as Emperor Gaozu (r. 202–195 BC). Chang'an (modern Xi'an) was chosen as the new capital of the reunified empire under Han.

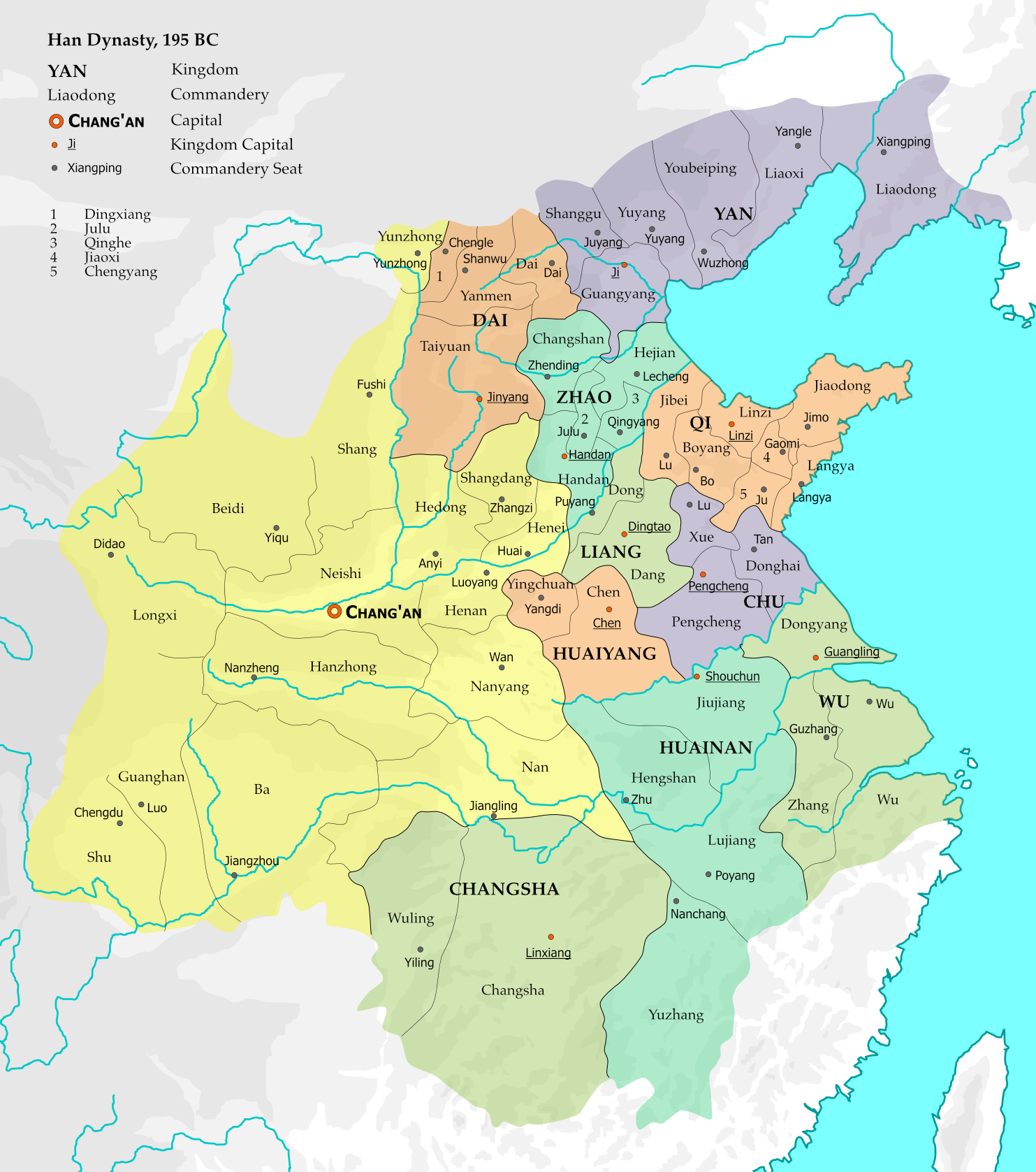
Thirteen direct-controlled commanderies including the capital region (yellow) and ten semi-autonomous kingdoms, 195 BC

At the beginning of the Western Han (traditional Chinese: 西漢; simplified Chinese: 西汉; pinyin: Xīhàn), also known as the Former Han (前漢; 前汉; Qiánhàn), thirteen centrally controlled commanderies—including the capital region—existed in the western third of the empire, while the eastern two-thirds were divided into ten semi-autonomous kingdoms. To placate his prominent commanders from the war with Chu, Emperor Gaozu enfeoffed some of them as kings.

By 196, the Han court had replaced all of these kings with royal Liu family members, with the lone exception of Changsha. The loyalty of non-relatives to the emperor was questioned, and after several insurrections by Han kings—with the largest being the Rebellion of the Seven States in 154—the imperial court began enacting a series of reforms that limited the power of these kingdoms in 145, dividing their former territories into new commanderies under central control. Kings were no longer able to appoint their own staff; this duty was assumed by the imperial court. Kings became nominal heads of their fiefs and collected a portion of tax revenues as their personal incomes. The kingdoms were never entirely abolished and existed throughout the remainder of Western and Eastern Han.

To the north of China proper, the nomadic Xiongnu chieftain Modu Chanyu (r. 209–174 BC) conquered various tribes inhabiting the eastern portion of the Eurasian Steppe. By the end of his reign, he controlled the Inner Asian regions of Manchuria, Mongolia, and the Tarim Basin, subjugating over twenty states east of Samarkand. Emperor Gaozu was troubled about the abundant Han-manufactured iron weapons traded to the Xiongnu along the northern borders, and he established a trade embargo against the group.

In retaliation, the Xiongnu invaded what is now Shanxi, where they defeated the Han forces at Baideng in 200 BC. After negotiations, the heqin agreement in 198 BC nominally held the leaders of the Xiongnu and the Han as equal partners in a royal marriage alliance, but the Han were forced to send large amounts of tribute items such as silk clothes, food, and wine to the Xiongnu.

Despite the tribute and negotiation between Laoshang Chanyu (r. 174–160 BC) and Emperor Wen (r. 180–157 BC) to reopen border markets, many of the Chanyu's subordinates chose not to obey the treaty and periodically raided Han territories south of the Great Wall for additional goods. In a court conference assembled by Emperor Wu (r. 141–87 BC) in 135 BC, the majority consensus of the ministers was to retain the heqin agreement. Emperor Wu accepted this, despite continuing Xiongnu raids.

However, a court conference the following year convinced the majority that a limited engagement at Mayi involving the assassination of the Chanyu would throw the Xiongnu realm into chaos and benefit the Han. When this plot failed in 133 BC, Emperor Wu launched a series of massive military invasions into Xiongnu territory. The assault culminated in 119 BC at the Battle of Mobei, when Han commanders Huo Qubing (d. 117 BC) and Wei Qing (d. 106 BC) forced the Xiongnu court to flee north of the Gobi Desert, and Han forces reached as far north as Lake Baikal.

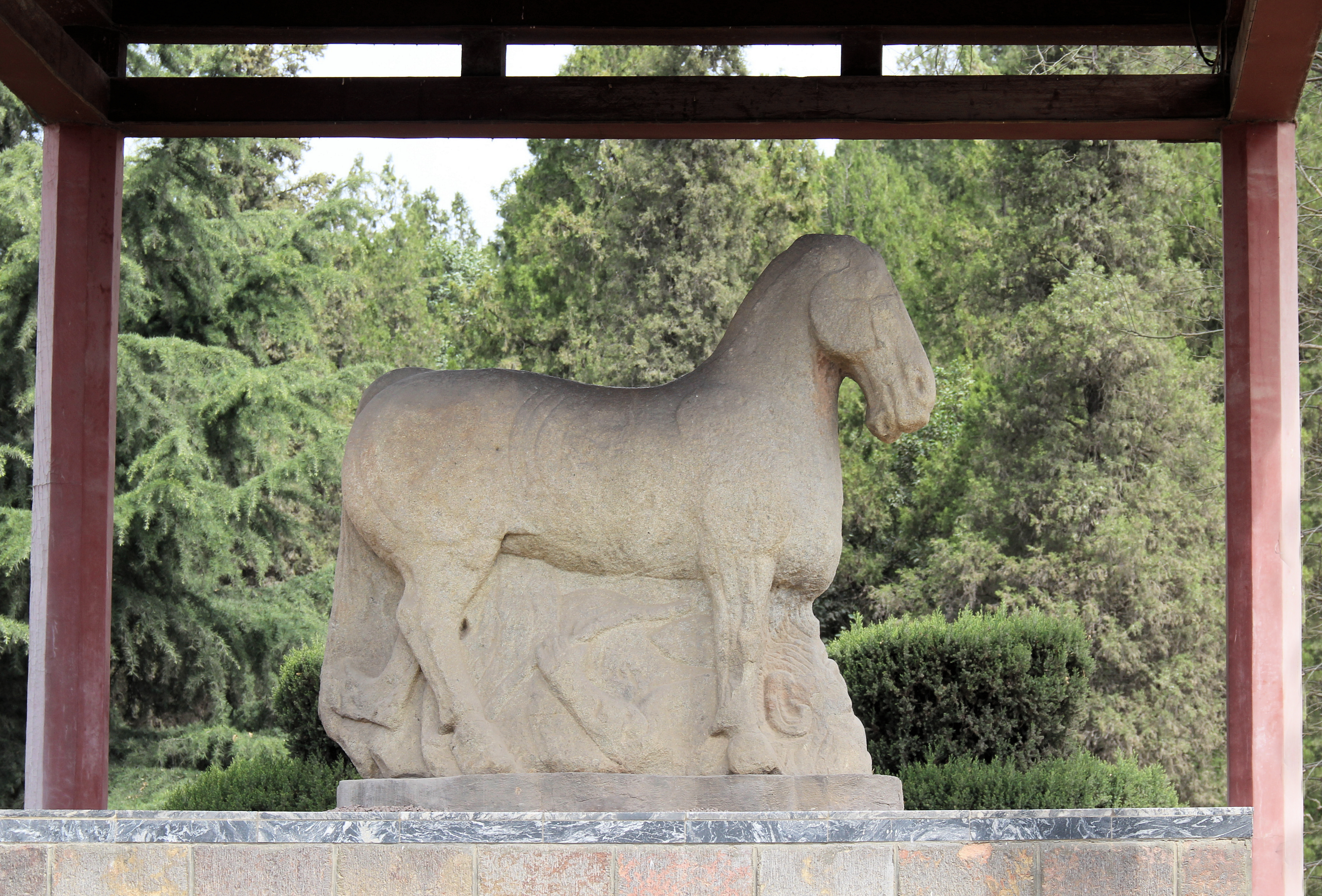
Statue of a horse trampling a Xiongnu warrior, at the mausoleum of Western Han general Huo Qubing (d. 117 BC), who fought in the Han–Xiongnu War. This is the first known monumental stone statue in China.

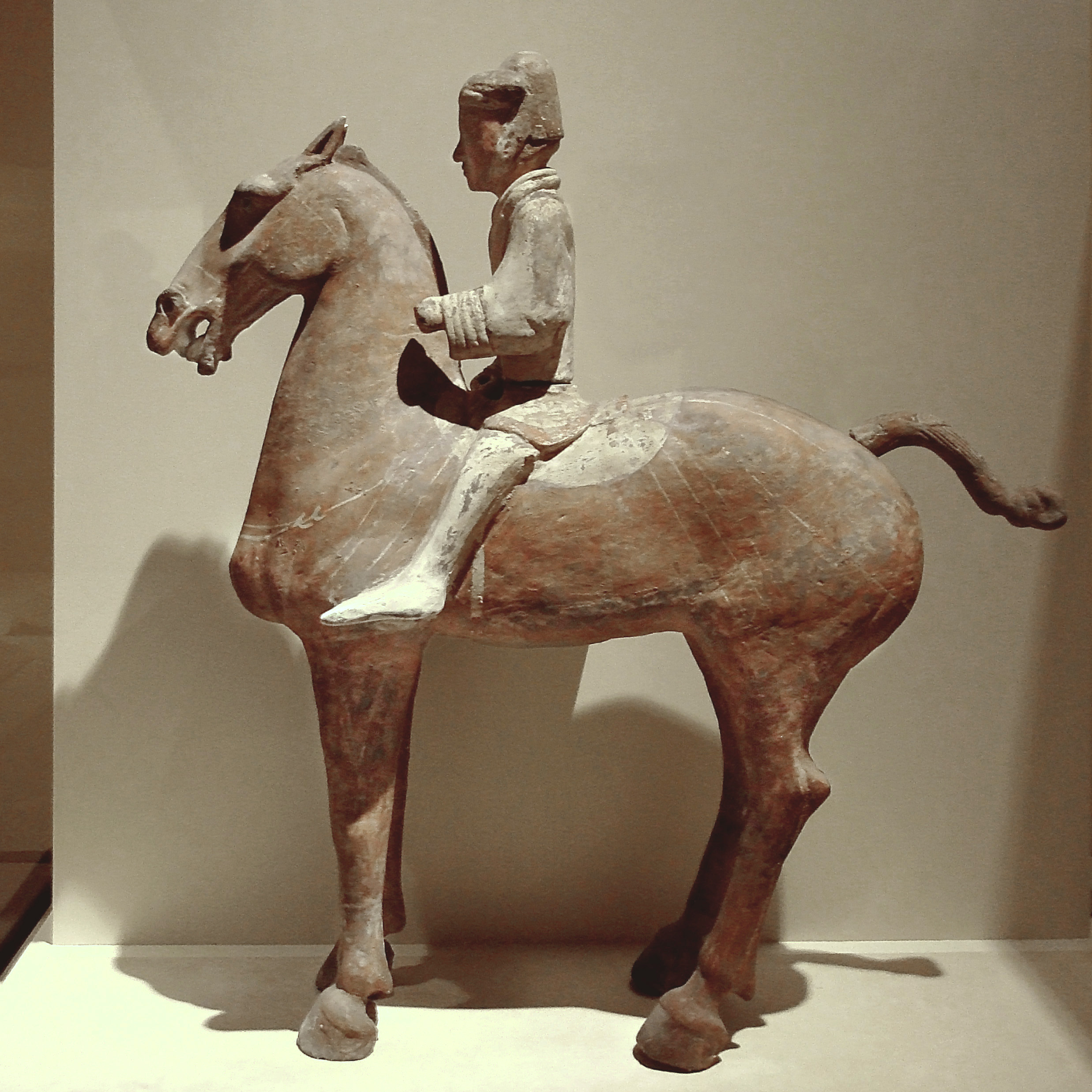
A Western Han painted ceramic mounted cavalryman from a general's tomb at Xianyang, Shaanxi

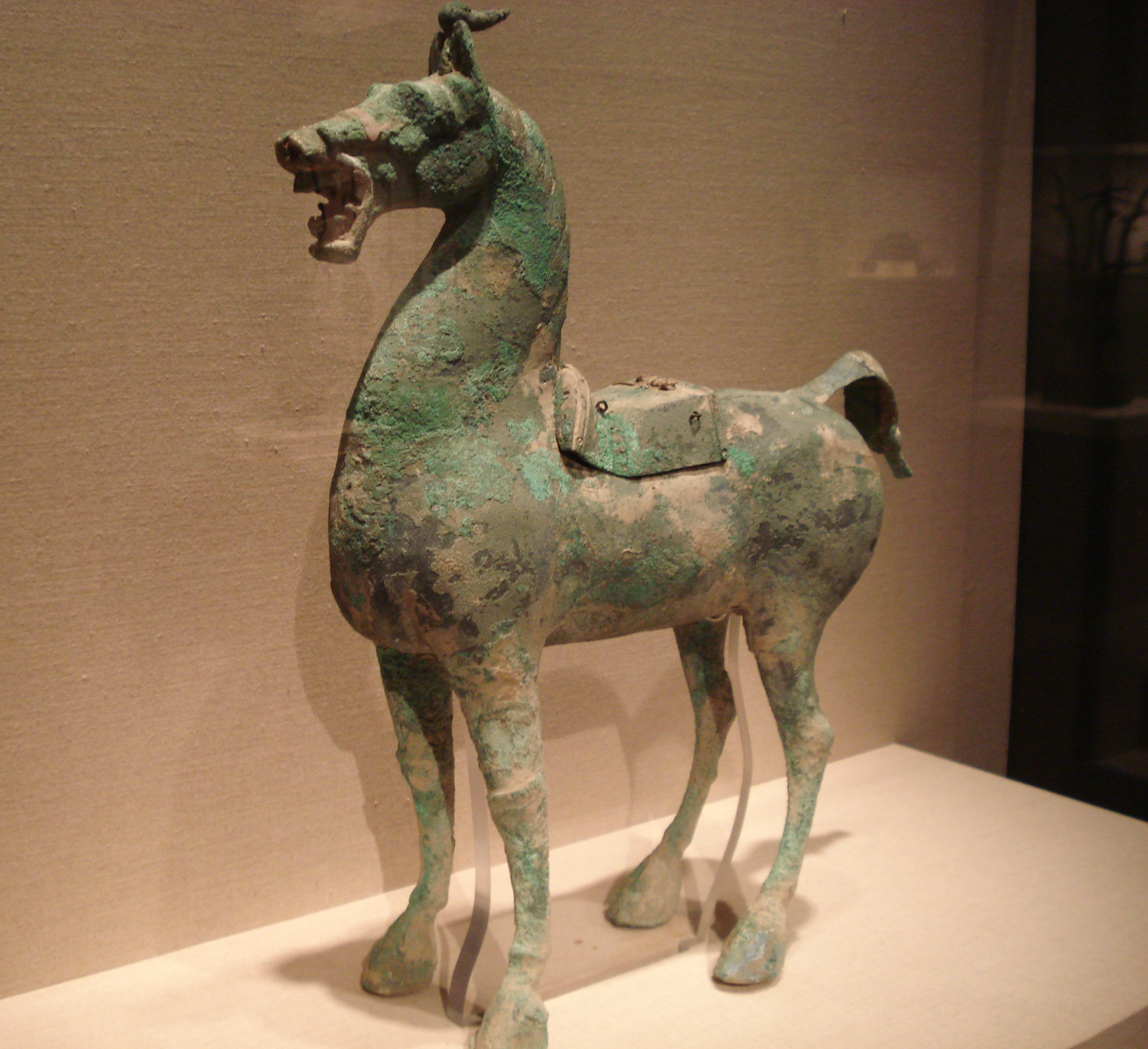
A Western or Eastern Han bronze horse statuette with a lead saddle

After Wu's reign, Han forces continued to fight the Xiongnu. The Xiongnu leader Huhanye (r. 58–31 BC) finally submitted to the Han as a tributary vassal in 51 BC. Huhanye's rival claimant to the throne, Zhizhi Chanyu (r. 56–36 BC), was killed by Han forces under Chen Tang and Gan Yanshou at the Battle of Zhizhi, in modern Taraz, Kazakhstan.

In 121 BC, Han forces expelled the Xiongnu from a vast territory spanning the Hexi Corridor to Lop Nur. They repelled a joint Xiongnu-Qiang invasion of this northwestern territory in 111 BC. In that same year, the Han court established four new frontier commanderies in this region to consolidate their control: Jiuquan, Zhangyi, Dunhuang, and Wuwei. The majority of people on the frontier were soldiers. On occasion, the court forcibly moved peasant farmers to new frontier settlements, along with government-owned slaves and convicts who performed hard labour. The court also encouraged commoners, such as farmers, merchants, landowners, and hired labourers, to voluntarily migrate to the frontier.

Even before the Han's expansion into Central Asia, diplomat Zhang Qian's travels from 139 to 125 BC had established Chinese contacts with many surrounding civilizations. Zhang encountered Dayuan (Fergana), Kangju (Sogdiana), and Daxia (Bactria, formerly the Greco-Bactrian Kingdom); he also gathered information on Shendu (the Indus River valley) and Anxi (the Parthian Empire). All of these countries eventually received Han embassies. These connections marked the beginning of the Silk Road trade network that extended to the Roman Empire, bringing goods like Chinese silk and Roman glasswares between the two.

From c. 115 BC until c. 60 BC, Han forces fought the Xiongnu over control of the oasis city-states in the Tarim Basin. The Han were eventually victorious and established the Protectorate of the Western Regions in 60 BC, which dealt with the region's defence and foreign affairs. The Han also expanded southward. The naval conquest of Nanyue in 111 BC expanded the Han realm into what are now modern Guangdong, Guangxi, and northern Vietnam. Yunnan was brought into the Han realm with the conquest of the Dian Kingdom in 109 BC, followed by parts of the Korean Peninsula with the Han conquest of Gojoseon and establishment of the Xuantu and Lelang commanderies in 108 BC. The first nationwide census in Chinese history was taken in 2 AD; the Han's total population was registered as comprising 57,671,400 individuals across 12,366,470 households.

To pay for his military campaigns and colonial expansion, Emperor Wu nationalised several private industries. He created central government monopolies administered largely by former merchants. These monopolies included salt, iron, and liquor production, as well as bronze coinage. The liquor monopoly lasted only from 98 to 81 BC, and the salt and iron monopolies were eventually abolished in the early Eastern Han. The issuing of coinage remained a central government monopoly throughout the rest of the Han dynasty. (Note: See also Hinsch (2002), pp. 21–22)

The government monopolies were eventually repealed when a political faction known as the Reformists gained greater influence in the court. The Reformists opposed the Modernist faction that had dominated court politics in Emperor Wu's reign and during the subsequent regency of Huo Guang (d. 68 BC). The Modernists argued for an aggressive and expansionary foreign policy supported by revenues from heavy government intervention in the private economy. The Han also copied the Qin's centralized administration but emphasized meritocracy and virtue. The Reformists, however, overturned these policies, favouring a cautious, non-expansionary approach to foreign policy, frugal budget reform, and lower tax-rates imposed on private entrepreneurs.

=== Wang Mang's reign and civil war ===
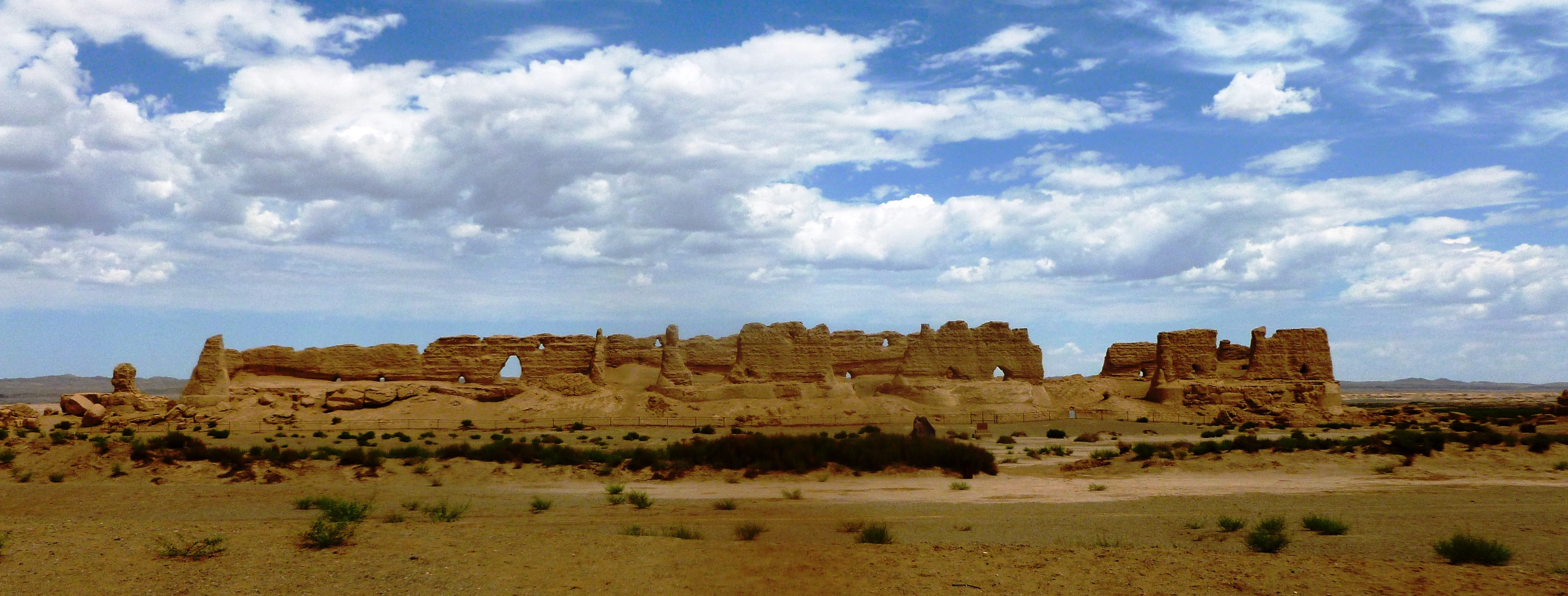
These rammed earth ruins of a granary in Hecang Fortress (河仓城; Hécāng chéng), located approximately 11 km (7 mi) northeast of the Western Han-era Yumen Pass, were built during the Western Han (202 BC – 9 AD) and was significantly rebuilt during the Western Jin (280–316 AD).

Wang Zhengjun (71 BC – 13 AD) was first empress, then empress dowager, and finally grand empress dowager during the reigns of the Emperors Yuan (r. 49–33 BC), Cheng (r. 33–7 BC), and Ai (r. 7–1 BC), respectively. During this time, a succession of her male relatives held the title of regent. Following the death of Ai, Wang Zhengjun's nephew Wang Mang (45 BC – 23 AD) was appointed regent as Marshall of State on 16 August under Emperor Ping (r. 1 BC – 6 AD).

When Ping died on 3 February 6 AD, Ruzi Ying (d. 25 AD) was chosen as the heir and Wang Mang was appointed to serve as acting emperor for the child. Wang promised to relinquish his control to Liu Ying once he came of age. Despite this promise, and against protest and revolts from the nobility, Wang Mang claimed on 10 January that the divine Mandate of Heaven called for the end of the Han dynasty and the beginning of his own: the Xin dynasty (9–23 AD).

Wang Mang initiated a series of major reforms that were ultimately unsuccessful. These reforms included outlawing slavery, nationalizing and equally distributing land between households, and introducing new currencies, a change which debased the value of coinage. Although these reforms provoked considerable opposition, Wang's regime met its ultimate downfall with the massive floods of c. 3 AD and 11 AD. Gradual silt build-up in the Yellow River had raised its water level and overwhelmed the flood control works. The Yellow River split into two new branches: one emptying to the north and the other to the south of the Shandong Peninsula, though Han engineers managed to dam the southern branch by 70 AD.

The flood dislodged thousands of peasant farmers, many of whom joined roving bandit and rebel groups such as the Red Eyebrows to survive. Wang Mang's armies were incapable of quelling these enlarged rebel groups. Eventually, an insurgent mob forced their way into the Weiyang Palace and killed Wang Mang.

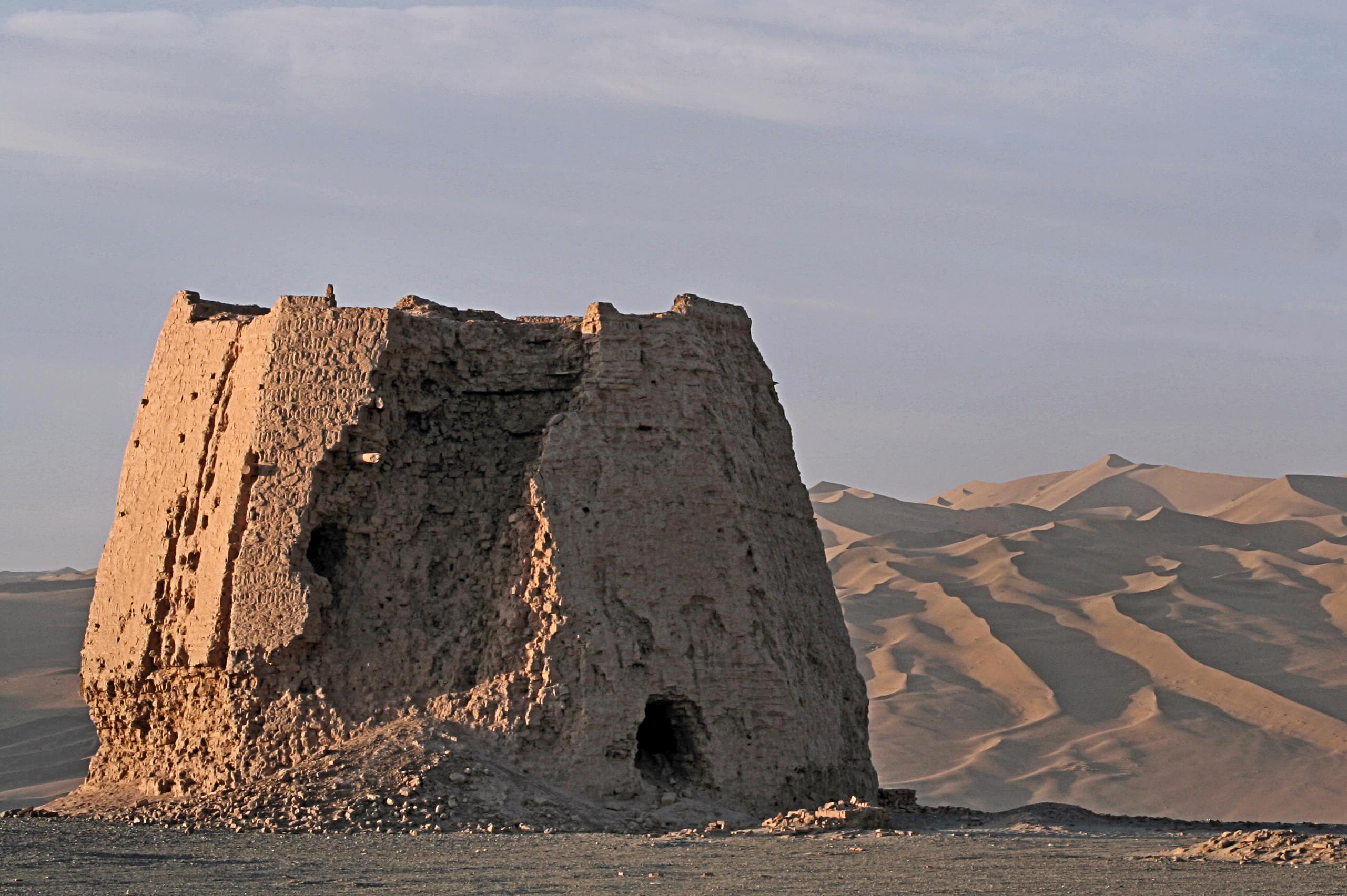
The ruins of a Han dynasty watchtower made of rammed earth at Dunhuang, located at the eastern edge of the Silk Road

The Gengshi Emperor (r. 23–25 AD), a descendant of Emperor Jing (r. 157–141 BC), attempted to restore the Han dynasty and occupied Chang'an as his capital. However, he was overwhelmed by the Red Eyebrow rebels who deposed, assassinated, and replaced him with the puppet monarch Liu Penzi. Gengshi's distant cousin Liu Xiu, known posthumously as Emperor Guangwu (r. 25–57 AD), after distinguishing himself at the Battle of Kunyang in 23 AD, was urged to succeed Gengshi as emperor.

Under Guangwu's rule, the Han Empire was restored. Guangwu made Luoyang his capital in 25 AD, and by 27 his officers Deng Yu and Feng Yi had forced the Red Eyebrows to surrender and executed their leaders for treason. From 26 until 36 AD, Emperor Guangwu had to wage war against other regional warlords who claimed the title of emperor; when these warlords were defeated, China reunified under the Han.

The period between the foundation of the Han dynasty and Wang Mang's reign is known as the Western Han (西漢; 西汉; Xīhàn) or Former Han (前漢; 前汉; Qiánhàn) (206 BC – 9 AD). During this period the capital was at Chang'an (modern Xi'an). From the reign of Guangwu the capital was moved eastward to Luoyang. The era from his reign until the fall of Han is known as the Eastern Han or Later Han (25–220 AD).

=== Eastern Han (25–220 AD) ===
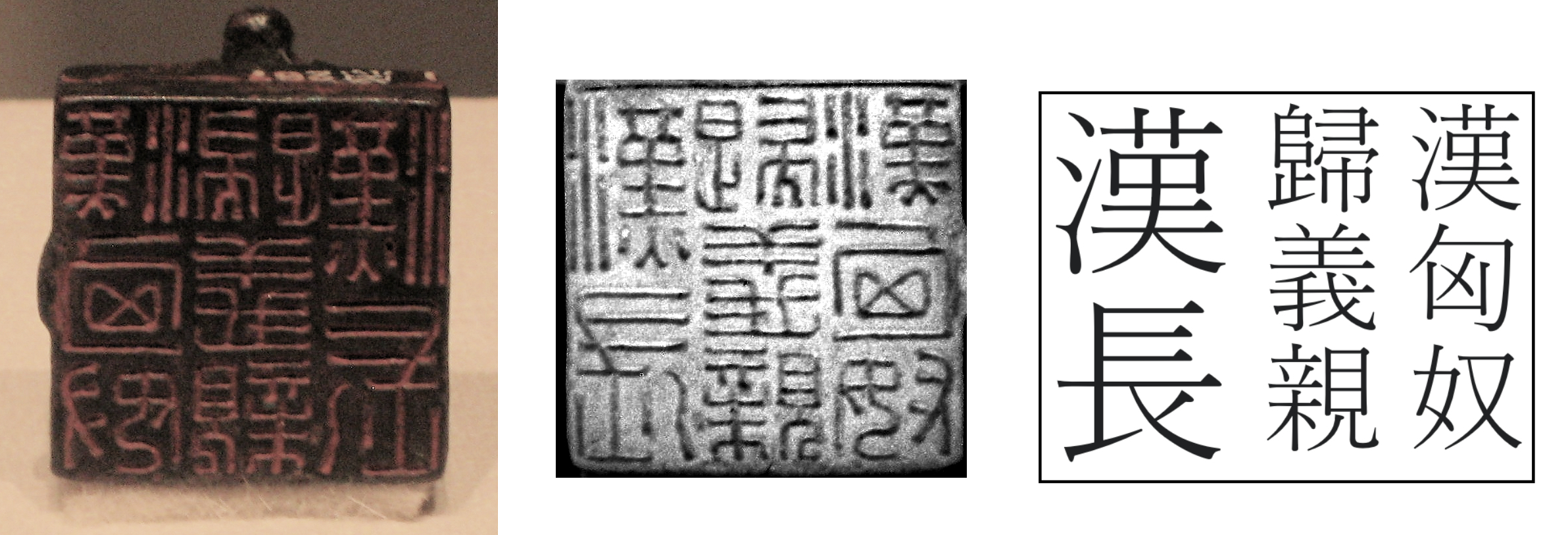
Bronze seal of a Xiongnu chieftain with impression and transcription, conferred by the Eastern Han government and inscribed with the following text: 漢匈奴，歸義親，漢長 ("The Chief of the Han Xiongnu, who have returned to righteousness and embraced the Han")

The Eastern Han (traditional Chinese: 東漢; simplified Chinese: 东汉; pinyin: Dōnghàn), also known as the Later Han (後漢; 后汉; Hòuhàn), formally began on 5 August AD 25, when Liu Xiu became Emperor Guangwu of Han. During the widespread rebellion against Wang Mang, the state of Goguryeo was free to raid Han's Korean commanderies; Han did not reaffirm its control over the region until AD 30.

The Trưng Sisters of Vietnam rebelled against Han in AD 40. Their rebellion was crushed by Han general Ma Yuan (d. AD 49) in a campaign from AD 42 to 43. Wang Mang renewed hostilities against the Xiongnu, who were estranged from Han until their leader Bi (比), a rival claimant to the throne against his cousin Punu (蒲奴), submitted to Han as a tributary vassal in AD 50. This created two rival Xiongnu states: the Southern Xiongnu led by Bi, an ally of Han, and the Northern Xiongnu led by Punu, an enemy of Han.

During the turbulent reign of Wang Mang, China lost control over the Tarim Basin, which was conquered by the Northern Xiongnu in AD 63 and used as a base to invade the Hexi Corridor in Gansu. Dou Gu (d. 88 AD) defeated the Northern Xiongnu at the Battle of Yiwulu in AD 73, evicting them from Turpan and chasing them as far as Lake Barkol before establishing a garrison at Hami. After the new Protector General of the Western Regions Chen Mu (d. AD 75) was killed by allies of the Xiongnu in Karasahr and Kucha, the garrison at Hami was withdrawn.

At the Battle of Ikh Bayan in AD 89, Dou Xian (d. AD 92) defeated the Northern Xiongnu chanyu who then retreated into the Altai Mountains. After the Northern Xiongnu fled into the Ili River valley in AD 91, the nomadic Xianbei occupied the area from the borders of the Buyeo Kingdom in Manchuria to the Ili River of the Wusun people. The Xianbei reached their apogee under Tanshihuai (d. AD 181), who consistently defeated Chinese armies. However, Tanshihuai's confederation disintegrated after his death.

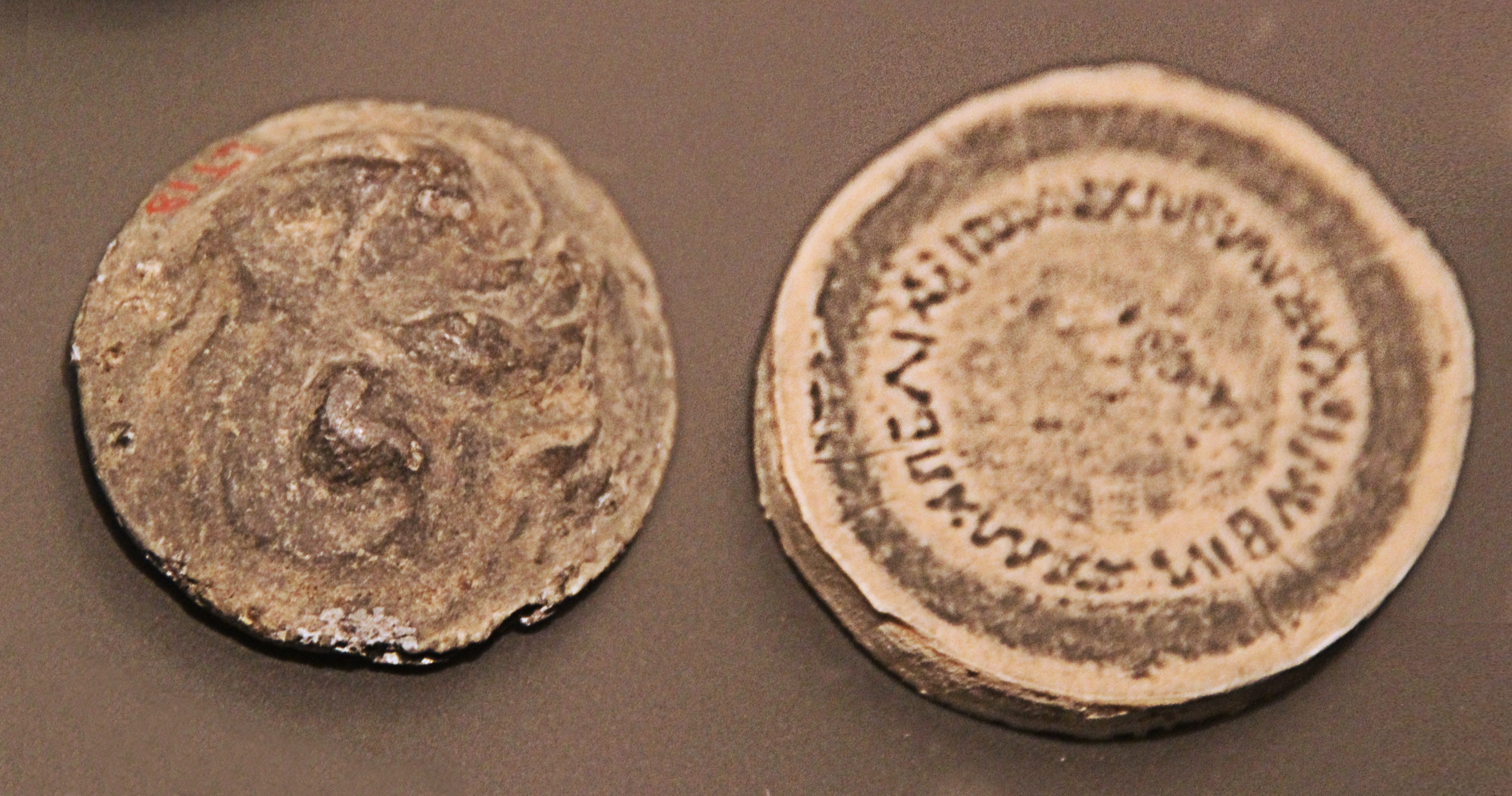
Eastern Han inscriptions on a lead ingot, using the Greek alphabet in the style of the Kushans, excavated in Shaanxi, 1st–2nd centuries AD – Gansu Provincial Museum

Ban Chao (d. AD 102) enlisted the aid of the Kushan Empire, which controlled territory across South and Central Asia, to subdue Kashgar and its ally Sogdiana. When a request by Kushan ruler Vima Kadphises (r. c. 90 – c. 100 AD) for a marriage alliance with the Han was rejected in AD 90, he sent his forces to Wakhan (modern-day Afghanistan) to attack Ban Chao. The conflict ended with the Kushans withdrawing because of lack of supplies. In AD 91, the office of Protector General of the Western Regions was reinstated when it was bestowed on Ban Chao.

Foreign travellers to the Eastern Han empire included Buddhist monks who translated works into Chinese, such as An Shigao from Parthia, and Lokaksema from Kushan-era Gandhara. In addition to tributary relations with the Kushans, the Han empire received gifts from sovereigns in the Parthian Empire, as well as from kings in modern Burma and Japan. He also initiated an unsuccessful mission to Rome in AD 97 with Gan Ying as emissary.

A Roman embassy of Emperor Marcus Aurelius (r. 161–180 AD) is recorded in the Weilüe and Book of Later Han to have reached the court of Emperor Huan of Han (r. 146–168 AD) in AD 166, yet Rafe de Crespigny asserts that this was most likely a group of Roman merchants. In addition to Roman glasswares and coins found in China, Roman medallions from the reign of Antoninus Pius and his adopted son Marcus Aurelius have been found at Óc Eo in Vietnam. This was near the commandery of Rinan where Chinese sources claim the Romans first landed, as well as embassies from Tianzhu in northern India in 159 and 161. Óc Eo is also thought to be the port city "Cattigara" described by Ptolemy in his Geography (c. 150 AD) as lying east of the Golden Chersonese (Malay Peninsula) along the Magnus Sinus (i.e. the Gulf of Thailand and South China Sea), where a Greek sailor had visited.

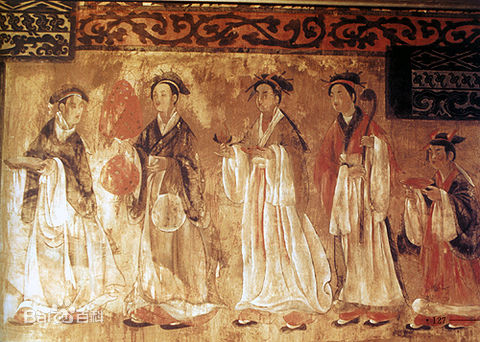
A mural showing women dressed in traditional hanfu from the late Eastern Han-era Dahuting Tomb in Zhengzhou, Henan

Emperor Zhang's (r. 75–88 AD) reign came to be viewed by later Eastern Han scholars as the high point of the dynastic house. Subsequent reigns were increasingly marked by eunuch intervention in court politics and their involvement in the violent power struggles of the imperial consort clans. In 92 AD, with the aid of the eunuch Zheng Zhong (d. 107 AD), Emperor He (r. 88–105 AD) had Empress Dowager Dou (d. 97 AD) put under house arrest and her clan stripped of power. This was in revenge for Dou's purging of the clan of his natural mother—Consort Liang—and then concealing her identity from him. After Emperor He's death, his wife Empress Deng Sui (d. 121 AD) managed state affairs as the regent empress dowager during a turbulent financial crisis and widespread Qiang rebellion that lasted from 107 to 118 AD.

When Empress Dowager Deng died, Emperor An (r. 106–125 AD) was convinced by the accusations of the eunuchs Li Run (李閏) and Jiang Jing (江京) that Deng and her family had planned to depose him. An dismissed Deng's clan members from office, exiled them, and forced many to commit suicide. After An's death, his wife, Empress Dowager Yan (d. 126 AD) placed the child Marquess of Beixiang on the throne in an attempt to retain power within her family. However, palace eunuch Sun Cheng (d. 132 AD) masterminded a successful overthrow of her regime to enthrone Emperor Shun of Han (r. 125–144 AD). Yan was placed under house arrest, her relatives were either killed or exiled, and her eunuch allies were slaughtered. The regent Liang Ji (d. 159 AD), brother of Empress Liang Na (d. 150 AD), had the brother-in-law of Consort Deng Mengnü (d. 165 AD) killed after Deng Mengnü resisted Liang Ji's attempts to control her. Afterward, Emperor Huan employed eunuchs to depose Liang Ji, who was then forced to commit suicide.

Students from the imperial university organised a widespread student protest against the eunuchs of Emperor Huan's court. Huan further alienated the bureaucracy when he initiated grandiose construction projects and hosted thousands of concubines in his harem at a time of economic crisis. Palace eunuchs imprisoned the official Li Ying (李膺) and his associates from the Imperial University on a dubious charge of treason. In 167 AD, the Grand Commandant Dou Wu (d. 168 AD) convinced his son-in-law, Emperor Huan, to release them. However, the emperor permanently barred Li Ying and his associates from serving in office, marking the beginning of the Partisan Prohibitions.

Following Huan's death, Dou Wu and the Grand Tutor Chen Fan (d. 168 AD) attempted a coup against the eunuchs Hou Lan (d. 172 AD), Cao Jie (d. 181 AD), and Wang Fu (王甫). When the plot was uncovered, the eunuchs arrested Empress Dowager Dou (d. 172 AD) and Chen Fan. General Zhang Huan (張奐) favoured the eunuchs. He and his troops confronted Dou Wu and his retainers at the palace gate where each side shouted accusations of treason against the other. When the retainers gradually deserted Dou Wu, he was forced to commit suicide.

Under Emperor Ling (r. 168–189 AD) the eunuchs had the partisan prohibitions renewed and expanded, while also auctioning off top government offices. Many affairs of state were entrusted to the eunuchs Zhao Zhong (d. 189 AD) and Zhang Rang (d. 189 AD) while Emperor Ling spent much of his time roleplaying with concubines and participating in military parades.

=== End of the Han dynasty ===
Provinces and commanderies in 219 AD, the penultimate year of the Han dynasty

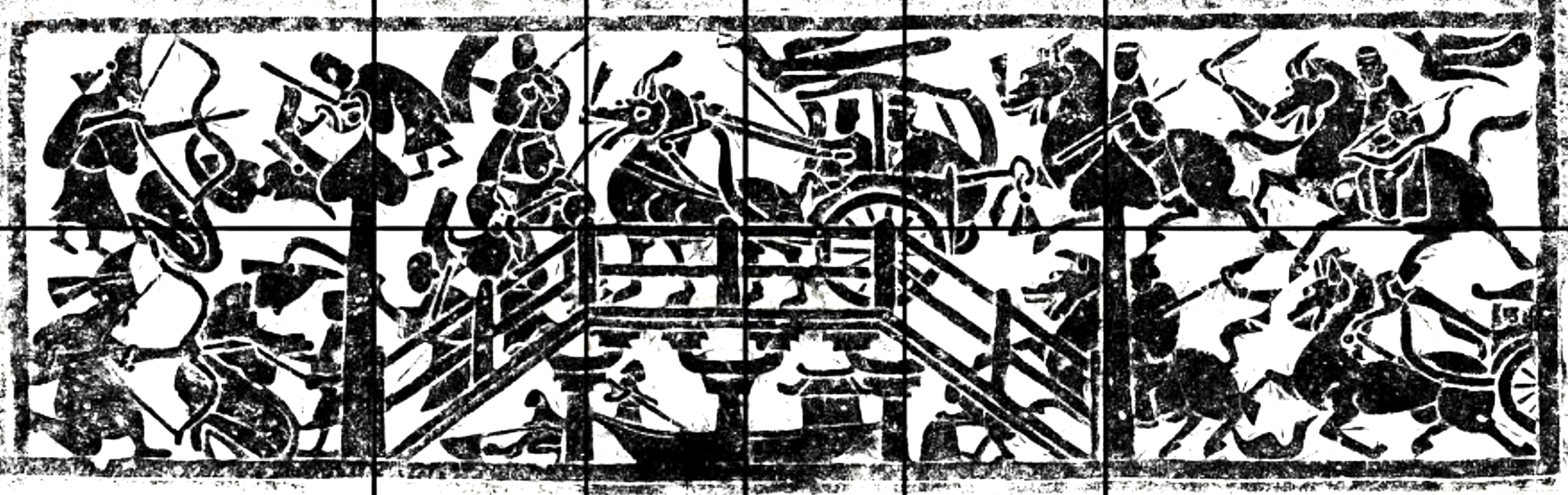
Eastern Han tombs sometimes have depiction of battles between Hu barbarians, with bows and arrows and wearing pointed hats (left), against Han troops; Eastern Han-era, Tsangshan tomb, Linyi; also visible in the Yinan tombs.

The Partisan Prohibitions were repealed during the Yellow Turban Rebellion and Five Pecks of Rice Rebellion in 184 AD, largely because the court did not want to continue to alienate a significant portion of the gentry class who might otherwise join the rebellions. The Yellow Turbans and Five-Pecks-of-Rice adherents belonged to two different hierarchical Taoist religious societies led by faith healers Zhang Jue (d. 184 AD) and Zhang Lu (d. 216 AD), respectively.

Zhang Lu's rebellion, in what is now northern Sichuan and southern Shaanxi, was not quelled until 215 AD. Zhang Jue's massive rebellion across eight provinces was annihilated by Han forces within a year; however, the following decades saw much smaller recurrent uprisings. Although the Yellow Turbans were defeated, many generals appointed during the crisis never disbanded their assembled militias and used these troops to amass power outside of the collapsing imperial authority.

General-in-chief He Jin (d. 189 AD), half-brother to Empress He (d. 189 AD), plotted with Yuan Shao (d. 202 AD) to overthrow the eunuchs by having several generals march to the outskirts of the capital. There, in a written petition to Empress He, they demanded the eunuchs' execution. After a period of hesitation, Empress He consented. When the eunuchs discovered this, however, they had her brother He Miao (何苗) rescind the order. The eunuchs assassinated He Jin on 22 September 189.

Yuan Shao then besieged Luoyang's Northern Palace while his brother Yuan Shu (d. 199 AD) besieged the Southern Palace. On 25 September both palaces were breached and approximately two thousand eunuchs were killed. Zhang Rang had previously fled with Emperor Shao (r. 189 AD) and his brother Liu Xie—the future Emperor Xian of Han (r. 189–220 AD). While being pursued by the Yuan brothers, Zhang committed suicide by jumping into the Yellow River.

General Dong Zhuo (d. 192 AD) found the young emperor and his brother wandering in the countryside. He escorted them safely back to the capital and was made Minister of Works, taking control of Luoyang and forcing Yuan Shao to flee. After Dong Zhuo demoted Emperor Shao and promoted his brother Liu Xie as Emperor Xian, Yuan Shao led a coalition of former officials and officers against Dong, who burned Luoyang to the ground and resettled the court at Chang'an in May 191 AD. Dong Zhuo later poisoned Emperor Shao.

Dong was killed by his adopted son Lü Bu (d. 198 AD) in a plot hatched by Wang Yun (d. 192 AD). Emperor Xian fled from Chang'an in 195 AD to the ruins of Luoyang. Xian was persuaded by Cao Cao (155–220 AD), then Governor of Yan Province in modern western Shandong and eastern Henan, to move the capital to Xuchang in 196 AD.

Yuan Shao challenged Cao Cao for control over the emperor. Yuan's power was greatly diminished after Cao defeated him at the Battle of Guandu in 200 AD. After Yuan died, Cao killed Yuan Shao's son Yuan Tan (173–205 AD), who had fought with his brothers over the family inheritance. His brothers Yuan Shang and Yuan Xi were killed in 207 AD by Gongsun Kang (d. 221 AD), who sent their heads to Cao Cao.

After Cao's defeat at the naval Battle of Red Cliffs in 208 AD, China was divided into three spheres of influence, with Cao Cao dominating the north, Sun Quan (182–252 AD) dominating the south, and Liu Bei (161–223 AD) dominating the west. Cao Cao died in March 220 AD. By December his son Cao Pi (187–226 AD) had Emperor Xian relinquish the throne to him and is known posthumously as Emperor Wen of Wei. This formally ended the Han dynasty and initiated an age of conflict between the Three Kingdoms: Cao Wei, Eastern Wu, and Shu Han.

== Culture and society ==
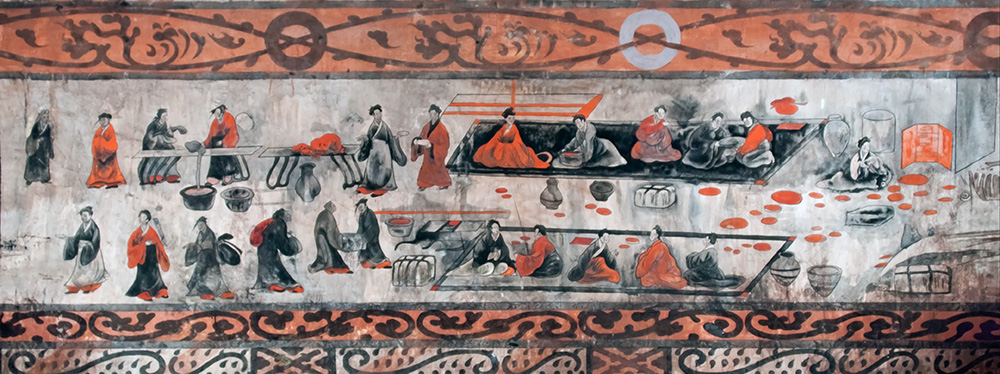
A late Eastern Han mural in a tomb, showing lively scenes of a banquet (yànyǐn 宴飲), dance and music (wǔyuè 舞樂), acrobatics (bǎixì 百戲), and wrestling (xiāngbū 相撲), from the Dahuting tomb in Zhengzhou, Henan

=== Social class ===
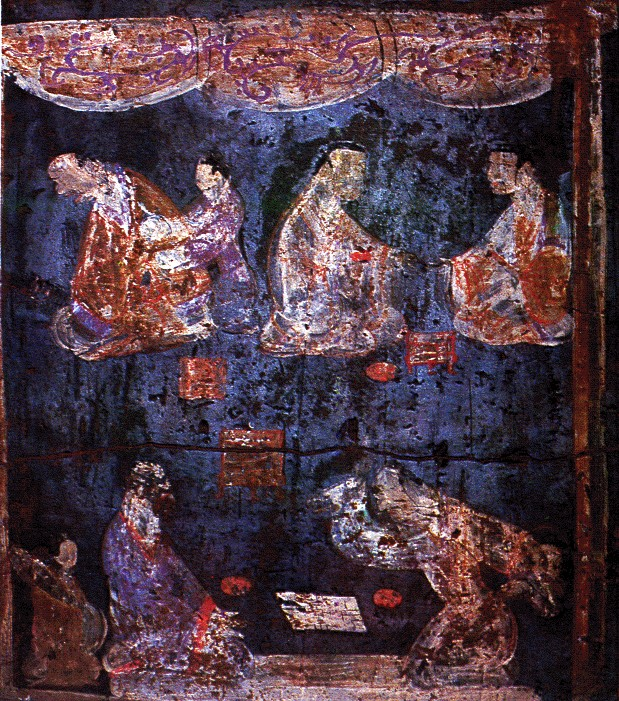
A mural from an Eastern Han tomb at Zhucun (朱村), Luoyang; the two figures in the foreground are playing liubo, with the playing mat between them, and the liubo game board to the side of the mat.

In the hierarchical Han social order, the emperor was at the apex of Han society and government. However, the emperor was often a minor, ruled over by a regent such as the empress dowager or one of her male relatives. Ranked immediately below the emperor were the kings who were of the same Liu family clan. The rest of society, including nobles lower than kings and all commoners excluding slaves, belonged to one of twenty ranks (èrshí gōngchéng, 二十公乘).

Each successive rank gave its holder greater pensions and legal privileges. The highest rank, of full marquess, came with a state pension and a territorial fiefdom. Holders of the rank immediately below, that of ordinary marquess, received a pension, but had no territorial rule. Scholar-bureaucrats who served in government belonged to the wider commoner social class and were ranked just below nobles in social prestige. The highest government officials could be enfeoffed as marquesses.

By the Eastern Han, local elites of unattached scholars, teachers, students, and government officials began to identify themselves as members of a nationwide gentry class with shared values and a commitment to mainstream scholarship. When the government became noticeably corrupt in mid-to-late Eastern Han, many gentry even considered the cultivation of morally grounded personal relationships more important than serving in public office.

Farmers, namely small landowner–cultivators, were ranked just below scholars and officials in the social hierarchy. Other agricultural cultivators were of a lower status, such as tenants, wage labourers, and slaves. The Han dynasty made adjustments to slavery in China and saw an increase in agricultural slaves. Artisans, technicians, tradespeople, and craftsmen had a legal and socioeconomic status between that of owner-cultivator farmers and common merchants.

State-registered merchants, who were forced by law to wear white-coloured clothes and pay high commercial taxes, were considered by the gentry as social parasites with a contemptible status. These were often petty shopkeepers of urban marketplaces; merchants such as industrialists and itinerant traders working between a network of cities could avoid registering as merchants and were often wealthier and more powerful than the vast majority of government officials.

Wealthy landowners, such as nobles and officials, often provided lodging for retainers who provided valuable work or duties, sometimes including fighting bandits or riding into battle. Unlike slaves, retainers could come and go from their master's home as they pleased. Physicians, pig breeders, and butchers had fairly high social status, while occultist diviners, runners, and messengers had low status.

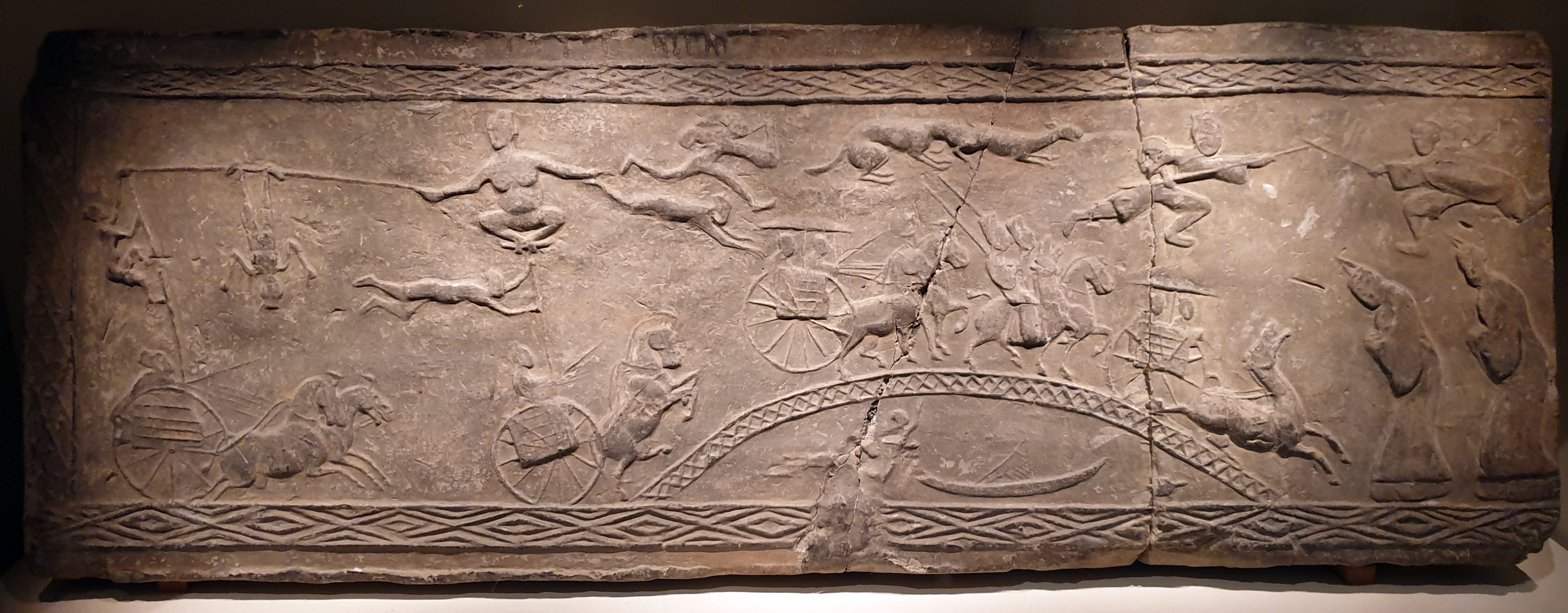
A Han dynasty brick relief with acrobats

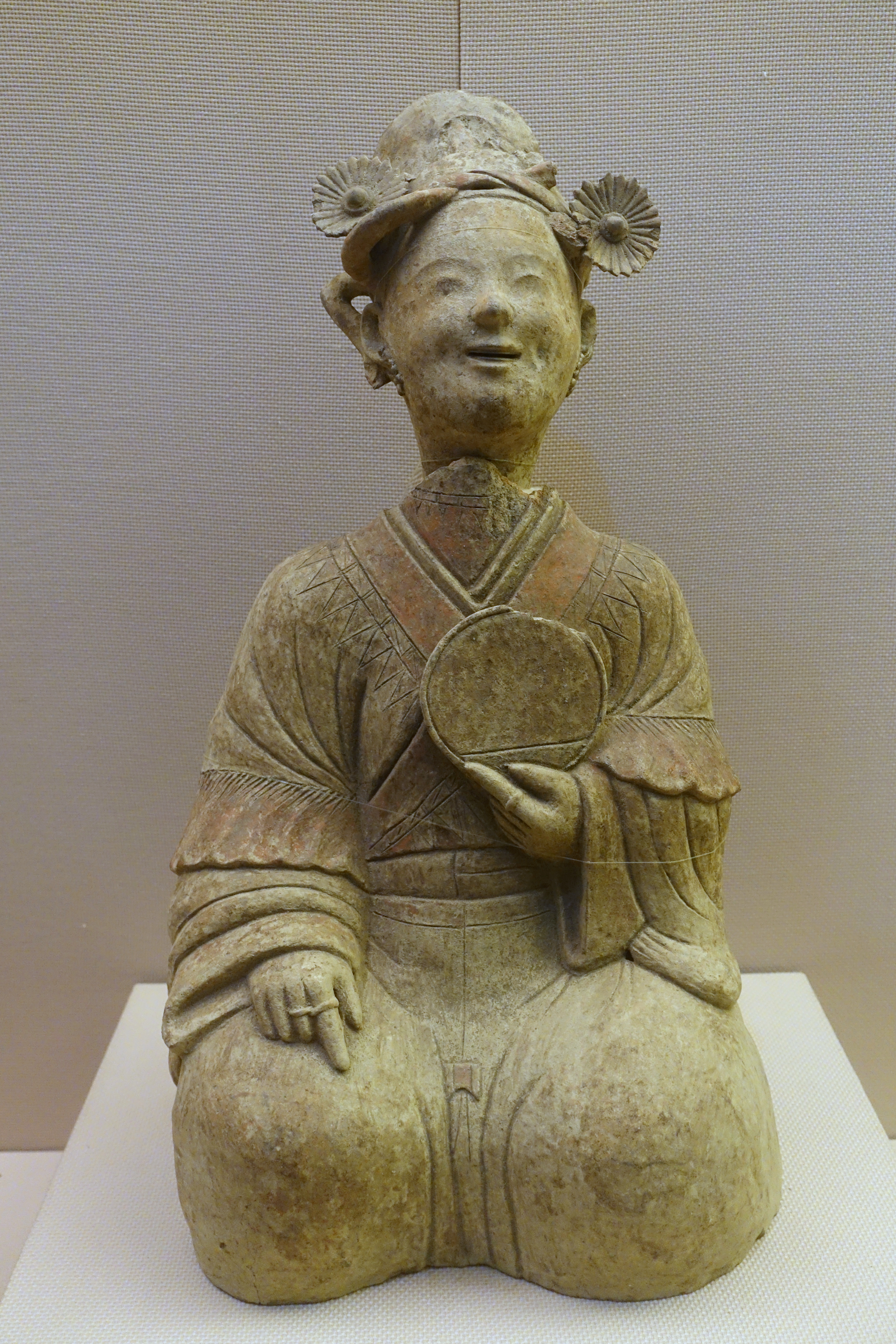
A ceramic statue of a seated woman holding a bronze mirror, Eastern Han – Sichuan Provincial Museum Chengdu

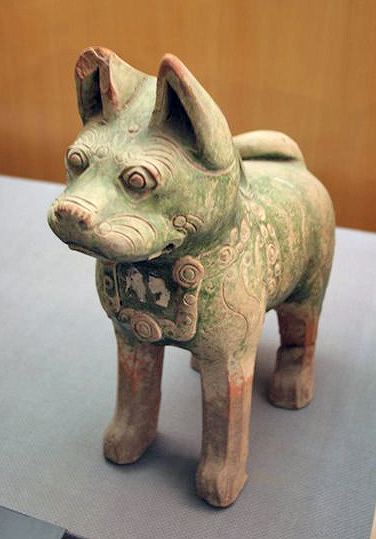
A dog figurine found in a Han tomb wearing a decorative dog collar, indicating their domestication as pets. Dog figurines are a common archaeological find in Han tombs, while it is also known from written sources that the emperor's imperial parks had kennels for keeping hunting dogs.

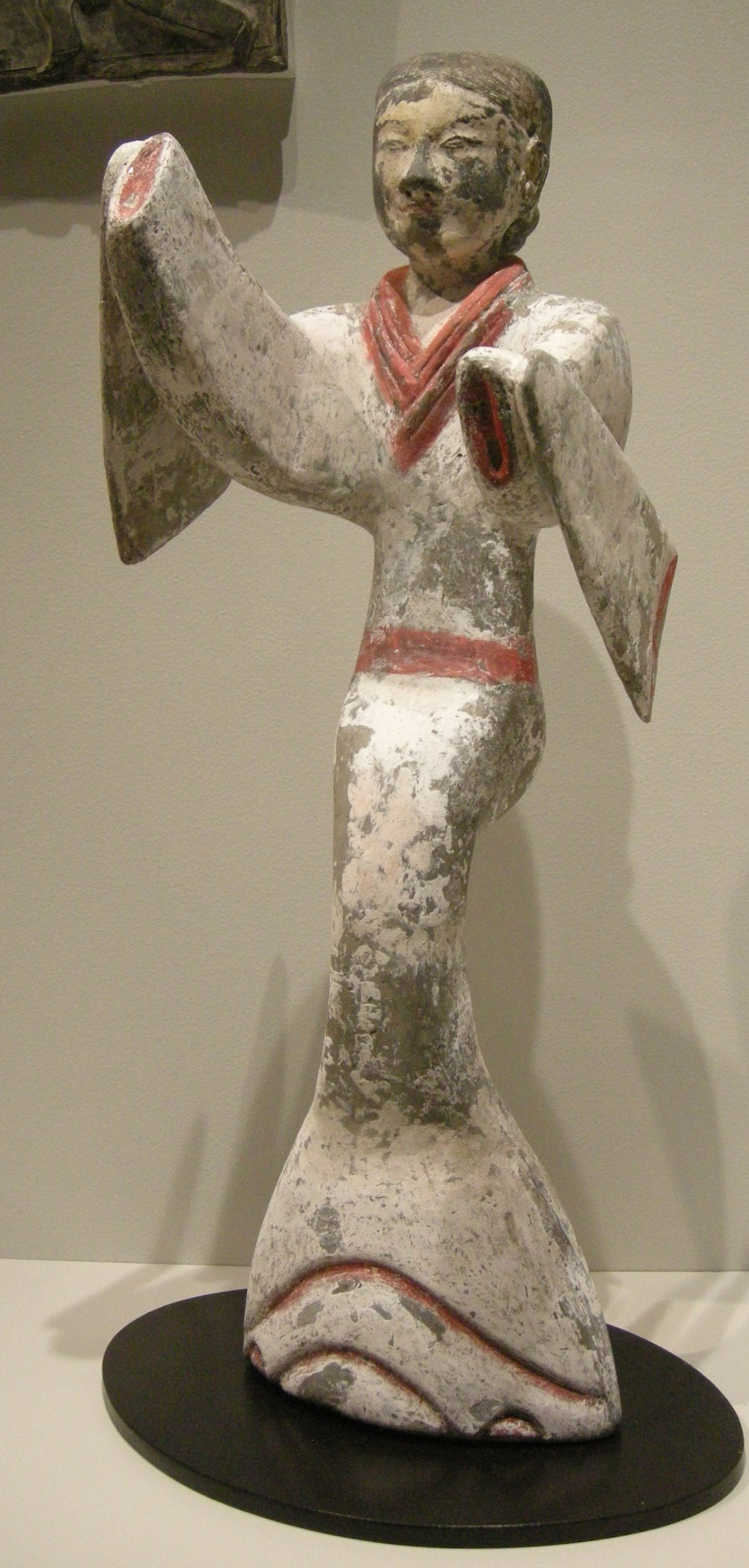
A Han pottery female dancer wearing Hanfu silk robes

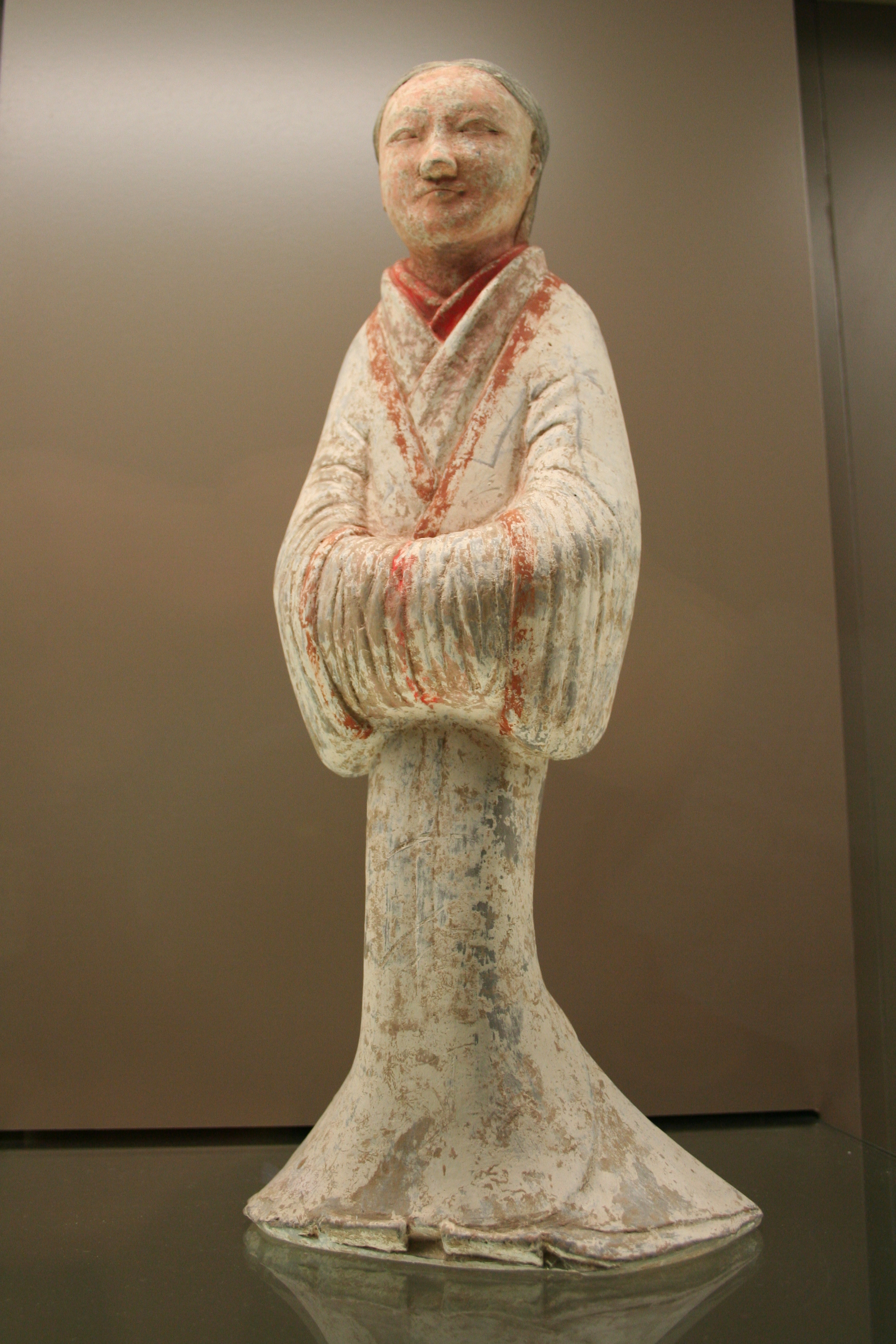
A ceramic female servant wearing Hanfu silk robes

=== Marriage, gender, and kinship ===
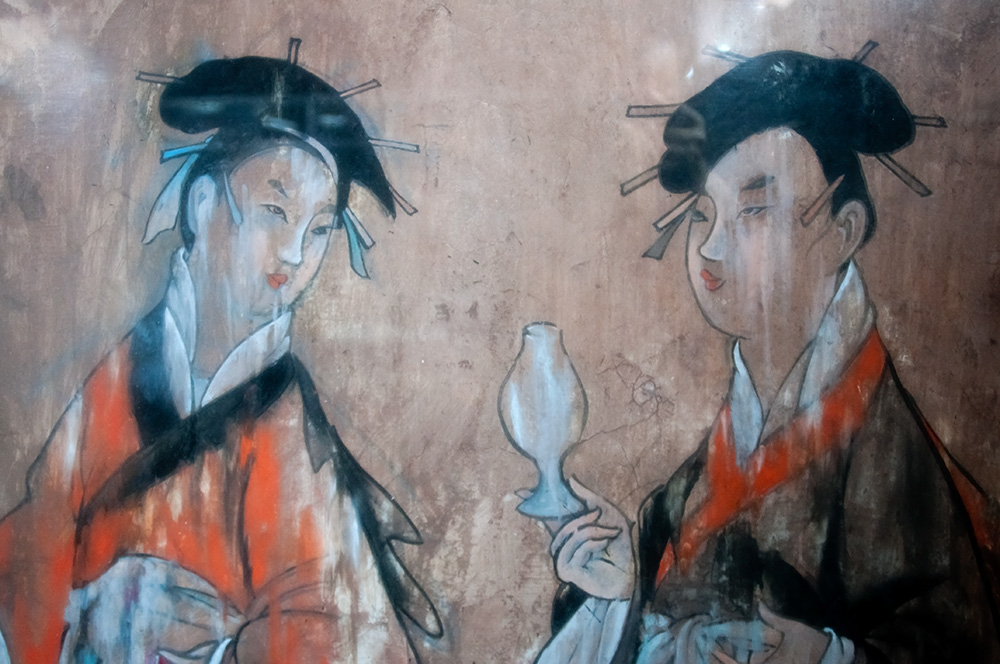
Detail of an Eastern Han mural showing two women wearing Hanfu robes, from Dahuting, Zhengzhou, Henan province

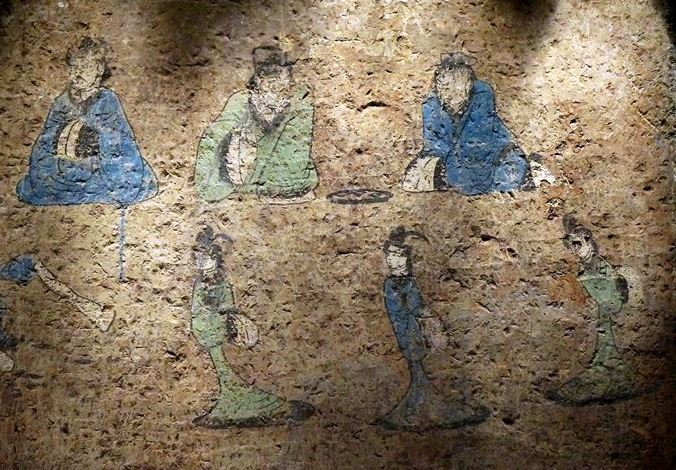
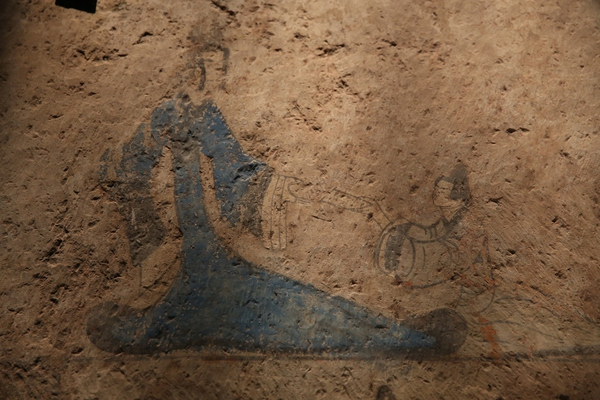
Western Han- or Xin-era murals showing men and women dressed in hanfu, with the Queen Mother of the West dressed in shenyi, from a tomb in Dongping, Shandong

The Han-era family was patrilineal and typically had four to five nuclear family members living in one household. Multiple generations of extended family members did not occupy the same house, unlike families of later dynasties. According to Confucian family norms, various family members were treated with different levels of respect and intimacy. For example, there were different accepted time frames for mourning the death of a father versus a paternal uncle.

Marriages were highly ritualized, particularly for the wealthy, and included many important steps. The giving of betrothal gifts, known as bride price and dowry, were especially important. A lack of either was considered dishonourable and the woman would have been seen not as a wife, but as a concubine. Arranged marriages were typical, with the father's input on his child's spouse being considered more important than the mother's.

Monogamous marriages were also normal, although nobles and high officials were wealthy enough to afford and support concubines as additional lovers. Under certain conditions dictated by custom, not law, both men and women were able to divorce their spouses and remarry. However, a woman who had been widowed continued to belong to her husband's family after his death. In order to remarry, the widow would have to be returned to her family in exchange for a ransom fee. Her children would not be allowed to go with her.

Among the nobility, bisexuality was the norm, continuing the accepted tradition of sexual expression amongst other nobles since the Zhou dynasty. In the Royal Court, Emperors often favoured eunuchs above other non-castrated men for their bodies' "sexual passivity". On the other hand, Han authors did not view male homosexual individuals as effeminate, as occurred in later dynasties. While non-royal nobility were obligated to heterosexual marriages, male concubines were widely accepted. Despite openness to bisexuality or homosexuality, Han dynasty norms around gender and family obligated most moral questions, including that of polygamy, homosexuality, and bisexuality, to be solved by the patriarch within the household.

Apart from the passing of noble titles or ranks, inheritance practices did not involve primogeniture; each son received an equal share of the family property. Unlike the practice in later dynasties, the father usually sent his adult married sons away with their portions of the family fortune. Daughters received a portion of the family fortune through their dowries, though this was usually much less than the shares of sons. A different distribution of the remainder could be specified in a will, but it is unclear how common this was.

Women were expected to obey the will of their father, then their husband, and then their adult son in old age. However, it is known from contemporary sources that there were many deviations to this rule, especially in regard to mothers over their sons, and empresses who ordered around and openly humiliated their fathers and brothers. Women were exempt from the annual corvée labour duties, but often engaged in a range of income-earning occupations aside from their domestic chores of cooking and cleaning.

The most common occupation for women was weaving clothes for the family, for sale at market, or for large textile enterprises that employed hundreds of women. Other women helped on their brothers' farms or became singers, dancers, sorceresses, respected medical physicians, and successful merchants who could afford their own silk clothes. Some women formed spinning collectives, aggregating the resources of several different families.

=== Education, literature, and philosophy ===
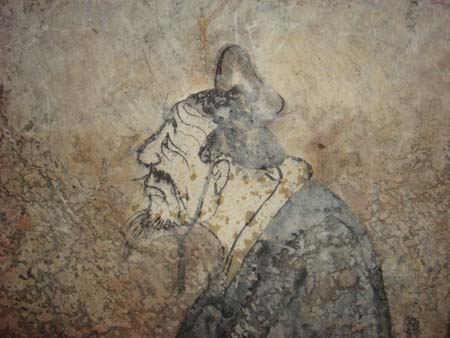
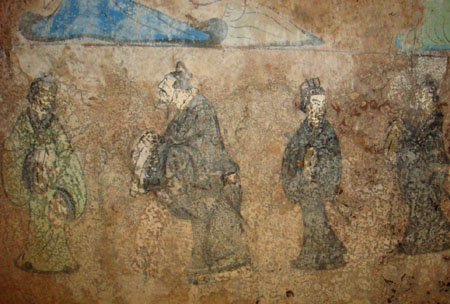
A Western Han fresco depicting Confucius and Laozi, from a tomb of Dongping County, Shandong

The early Western Han court simultaneously accepted the philosophical teachings of Legalism, Huang-Lao Taoism, and Confucianism in making state decisions and shaping government policy. However, the Han court under Emperor Wu gave Confucianism exclusive patronage. In 136 BC, he abolished all academic chairs not concerned with the Five Classics, and in 124 BC he established the Imperial University, at which he encouraged nominees for office to receive a Confucian education.

Unlike the original ideology espoused by Confucius (551–479 BC), Han Confucianism in Emperor Wu's reign was the creation of Dong Zhongshu (179–104 BC). Dong was a scholar and minor official who aggregated the ethical Confucian ideas of ritual, filial piety, and harmonious relationships with five phases and yin-yang cosmologies. Dong's synthesis justified the imperial system of government within the natural order of the universe.

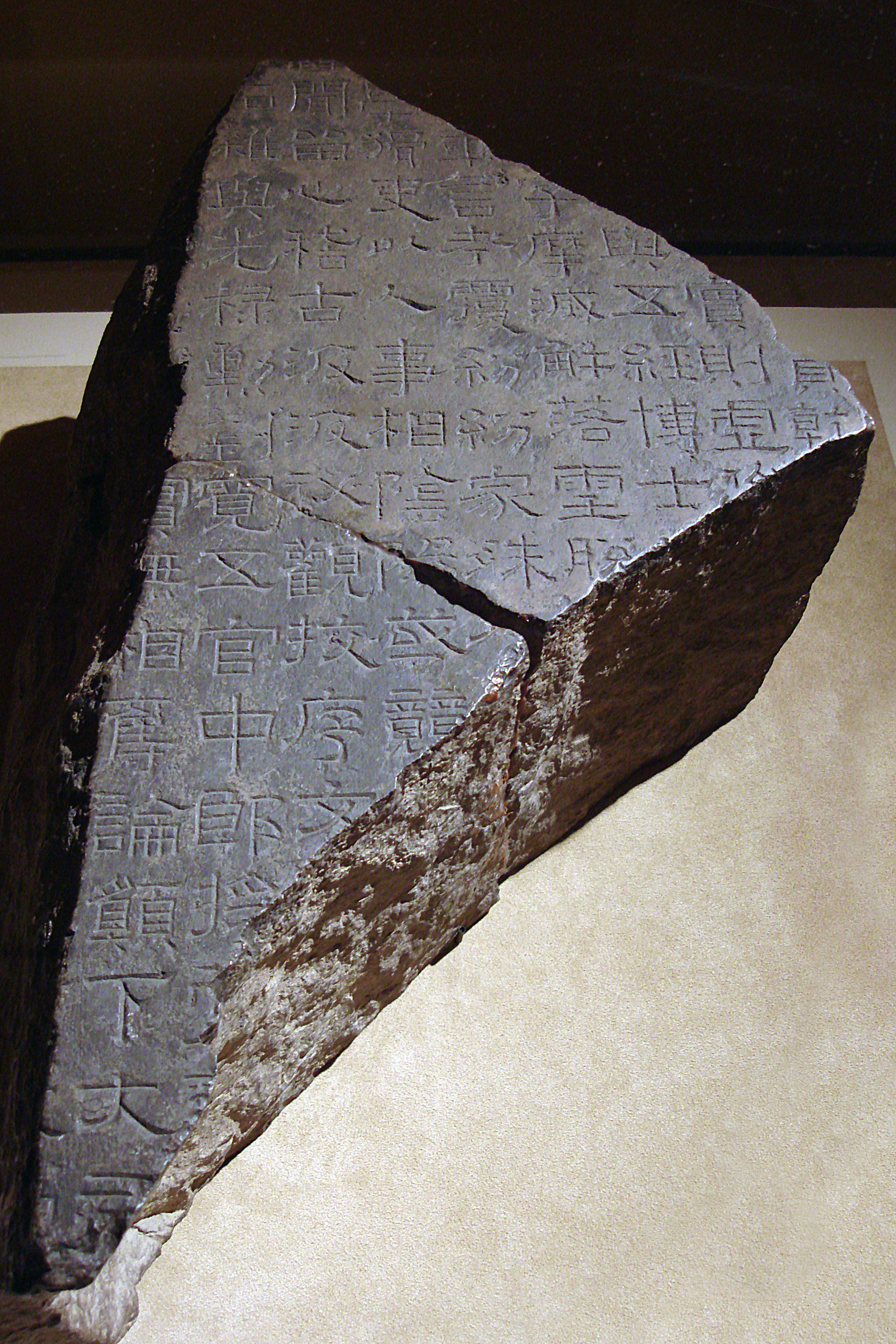
A fragment of the Xiping Stone Classics; these stone-carved Five Classics installed during Emperor Ling's reign along the roadside of the imperial university right outside Luoyang, were made at the instigation of Cai Yong (132–192 AD), who feared the Classics housed in the imperial library were being interpolated by University Academicians.

The Imperial University grew in importance as the student body grew to over 30,000 by the 2nd century AD. A Confucian-based education was also made available at commandery-level schools and private schools opened in small towns, where teachers earned respectable incomes from tuition payments. Schools were established in far southern regions where standard Chinese texts were used to assimilate the local populace.

Some important texts were created and studied by scholars. Philosophy written by Yang Xiong (53 BC – 18 AD), Huan Tan (43 BC – 28 AD), Wang Chong (27–100 AD), and Wang Fu (78–163 AD) questioned whether human nature was innately good or evil and posed challenges to Dong's universal order. The Shiji started by Sima Tan (d. 110 BC) and finished by his son Sima Qian (145–86 BC) established the standard model for imperial China's tradition of official histories, being emulated initially by the Book of Han authored by Ban Biao (3–54 AD) with his son Ban Gu (32–92 AD), and his daughter Ban Zhao (45–116 AD). Biographies on important figures were written by members of the gentry. There were also dictionaries published during the Han period such as the Shuowen Jiezi by Xu Shen (c. 58 – c. 147 AD) and the Fangyan by Yang Xiong. Han dynasty poetry was dominated by the fu genre, which achieved its greatest prominence during the reign of Emperor Wu.

=== Law and order ===
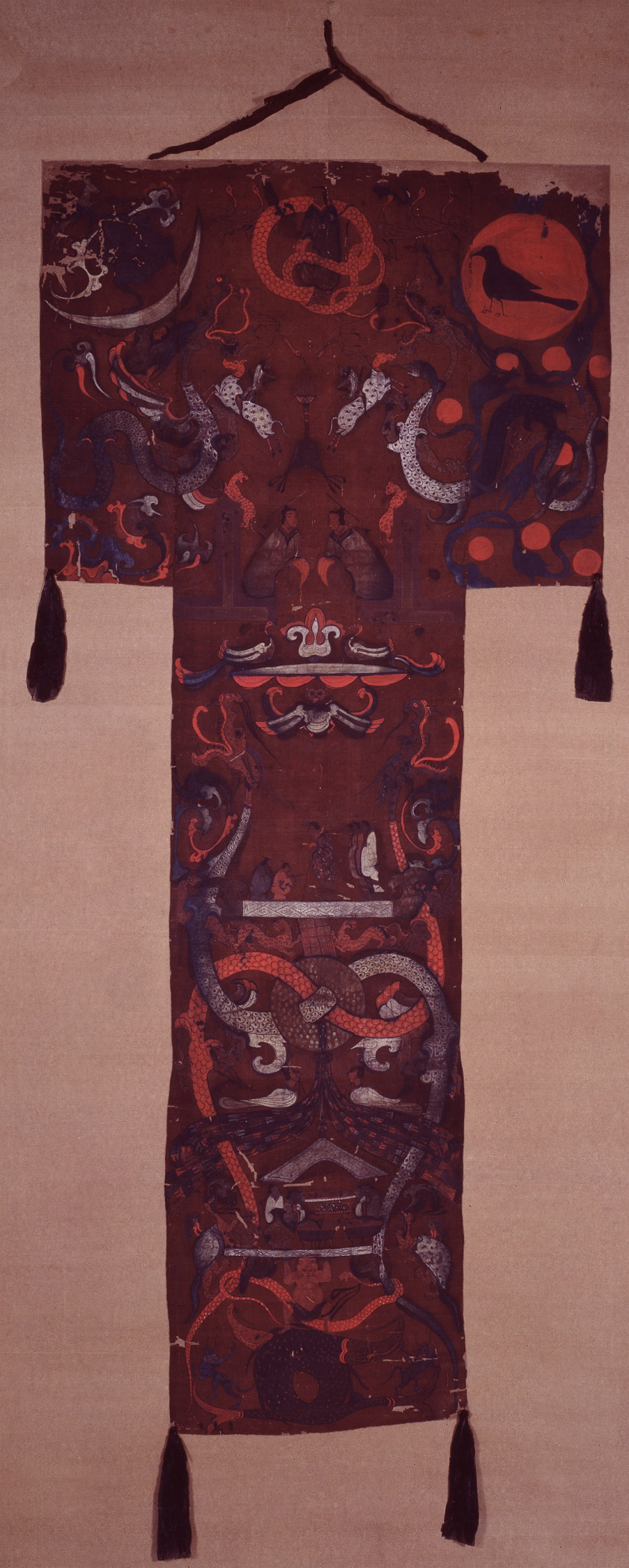
A silk banner from Mawangdui, draped over the coffin of Lady Dai (d. 168 BC), wife of the Marquess Li Cang (利蒼) (d. 186 BC), chancellor for the Kingdom of Changsha.

Han scholars such as Jia Yi (201–169 BC) portrayed the Qin as a brutal regime. However, archaeological evidence from Zhangjiashan and Shuihudi reveal that many of the statutes in the Han law code compiled by Chancellor Xiao He (d. 193 BC) were derived from Qin law.

Various cases for rape, physical abuse, and murder were prosecuted in court. Women, although usually having fewer rights by custom, were allowed to level civil and criminal charges against men. While suspects were jailed, convicted criminals were never imprisoned. Instead, punishments were commonly monetary fines, periods of forced hard labour for convicts, and the penalty of death by beheading. Early Han punishments of torturous mutilation were borrowed from Qin law. A series of reforms abolished mutilation punishments with progressively less-severe beatings by the bastinado.

Acting as a judge in lawsuits was one of the many duties of the county magistrate and Administrators of commanderies. Complex, high-profile, or unresolved cases were often deferred to the Minister of Justice in the capital or even the emperor. In each Han county was several districts, each overseen by a chief of police. Order in the cities was maintained by government officers in the marketplaces and constables in the neighbourhoods.

=== Food ===
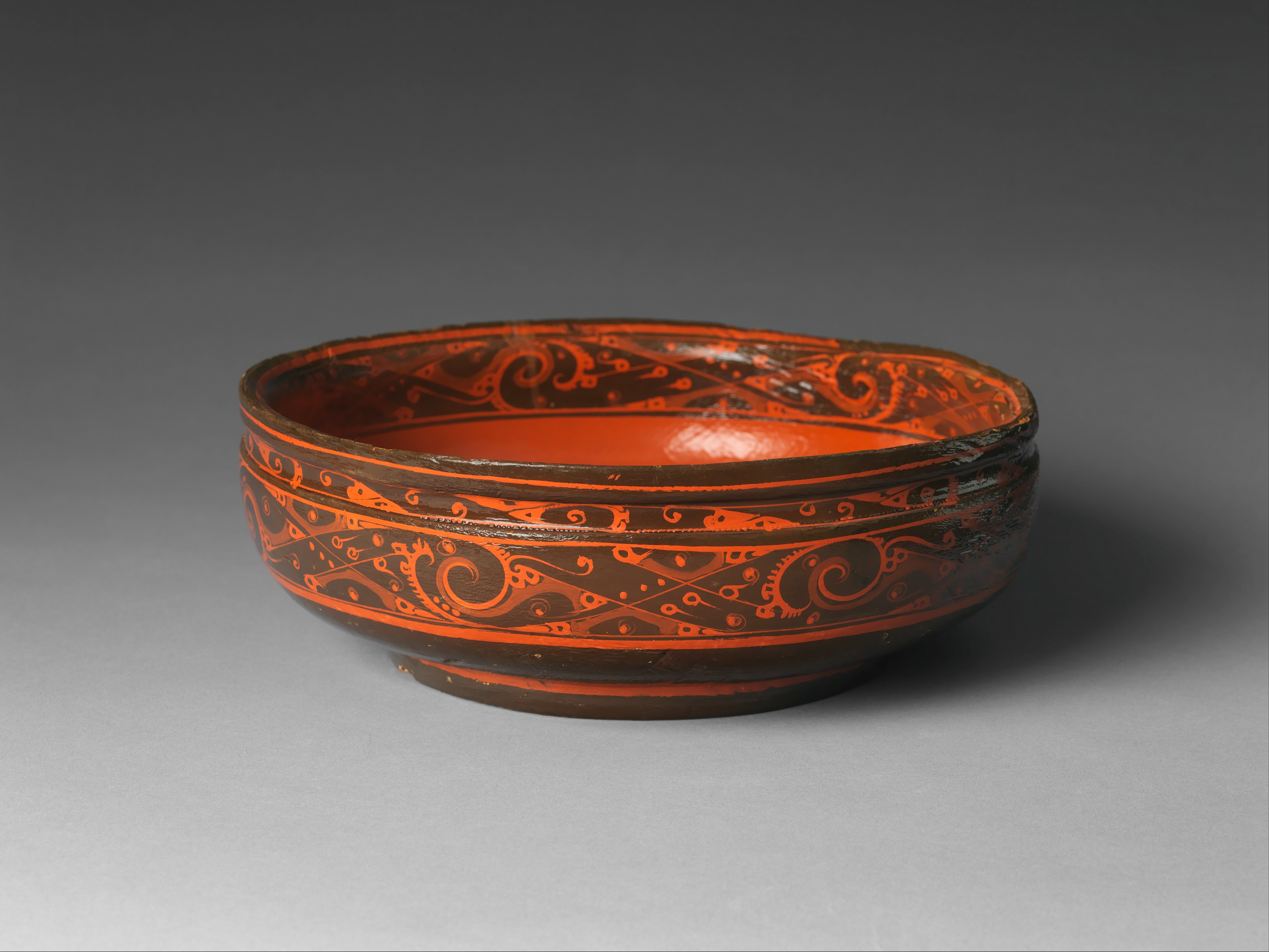
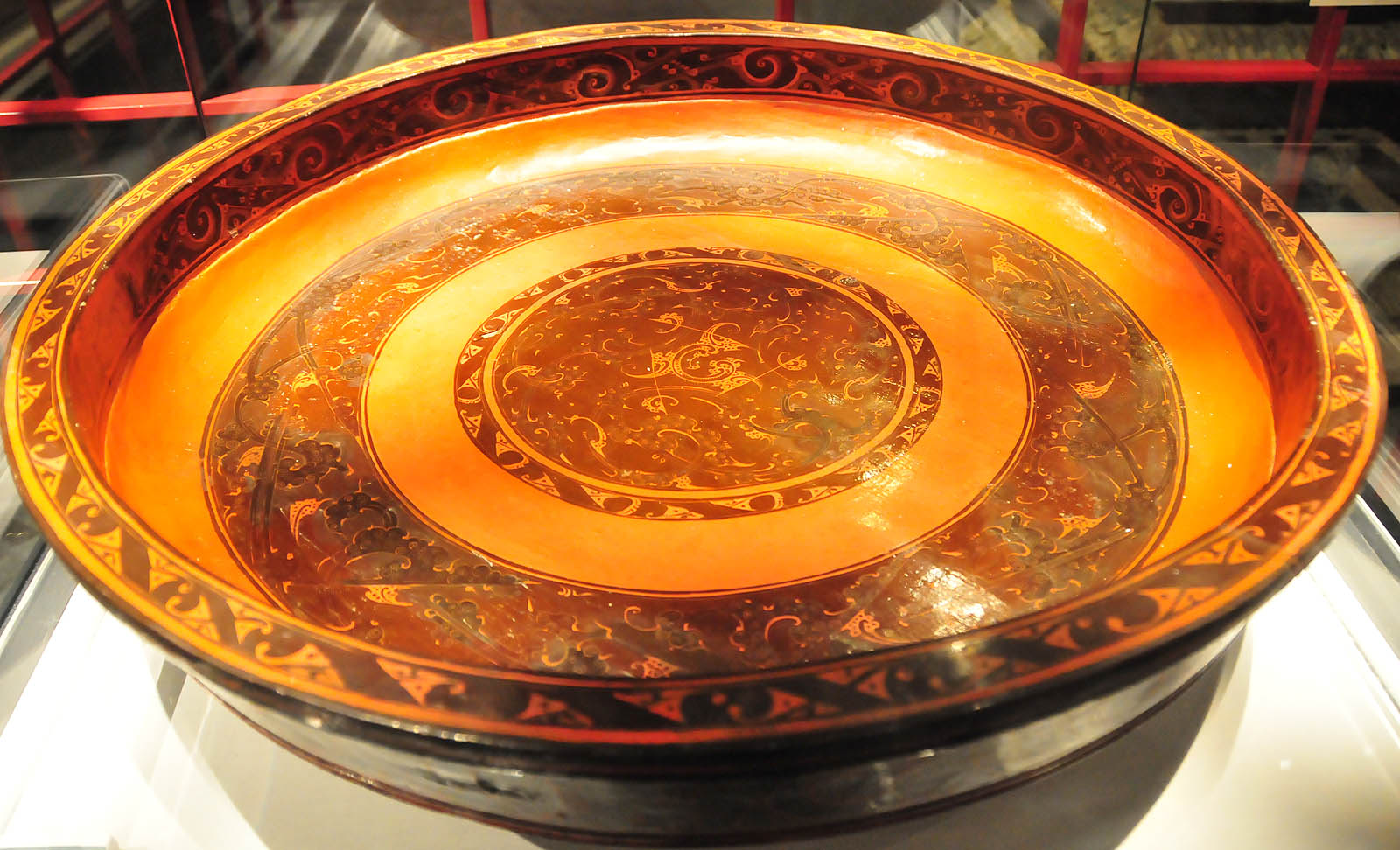
Two Han dynasty red-and-black lacquerwares, one a bowl, the other a tray; usually only wealthy officials, nobles, and merchants could afford domestic luxury items like lacquerwares, which were common commodities produced by skilled artisans and craftsmen.

The most common staple crops consumed during Han were wheat, barley, foxtail millet, proso millet, rice, and beans. Commonly eaten fruits and vegetables included chestnuts, pears, plums, peaches, melons, apricots, strawberries, red bayberries, jujubes, calabash, bamboo shoots, mustard plant, and taro. Domesticated animals that were also eaten included chickens, Mandarin ducks, geese, cows, sheep, pigs, camels, and dogs (various types were bred specifically for food, while most were used as pets). Turtles and fish were taken from streams and lakes. Commonly hunted game, such as owl, pheasant, magpie, sika deer, and Chinese bamboo partridge were consumed. Seasoning included sugar, honey, salt, and soy sauce. Beer and wine were regularly consumed.

=== Clothing ===
The types of clothing worn and the materials used during the Han period depended upon social class. Wealthy folk could afford silk robes, skirts, socks, and mittens, coats made of badger or fox fur, duck plumes, and slippers with inlaid leather, pearls, and silk lining. Peasants commonly wore clothes made of hemp, wool, and ferret skins.

=== Religion, cosmology, and metaphysics ===
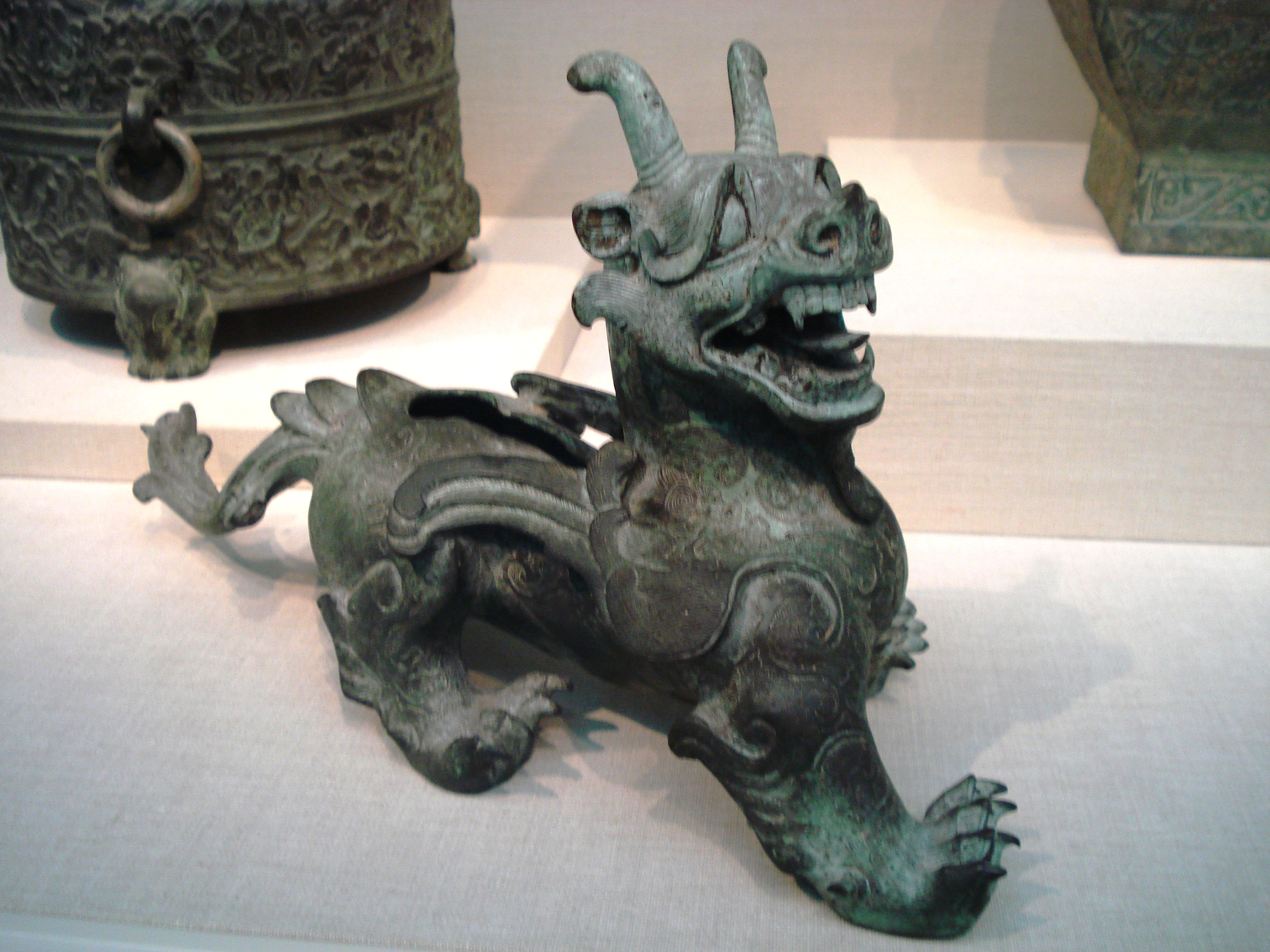
An Eastern Han bronze statuette of a qilin, 1st century AD

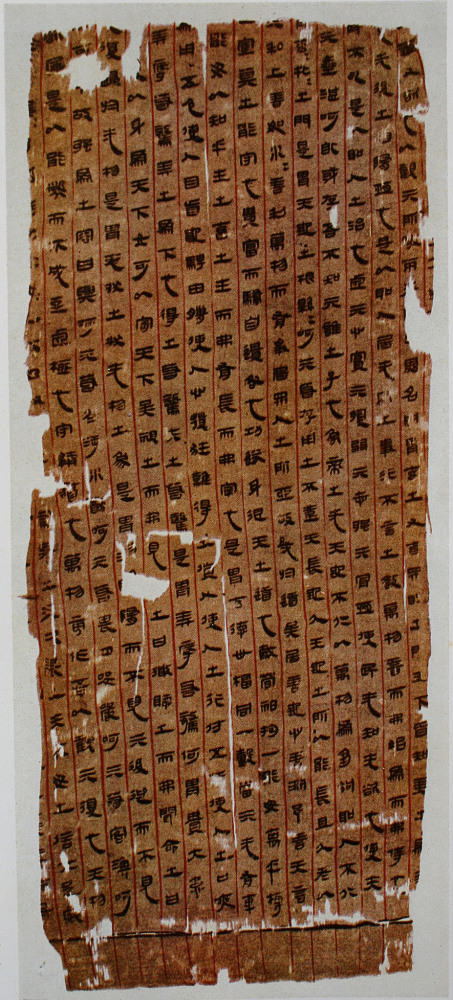
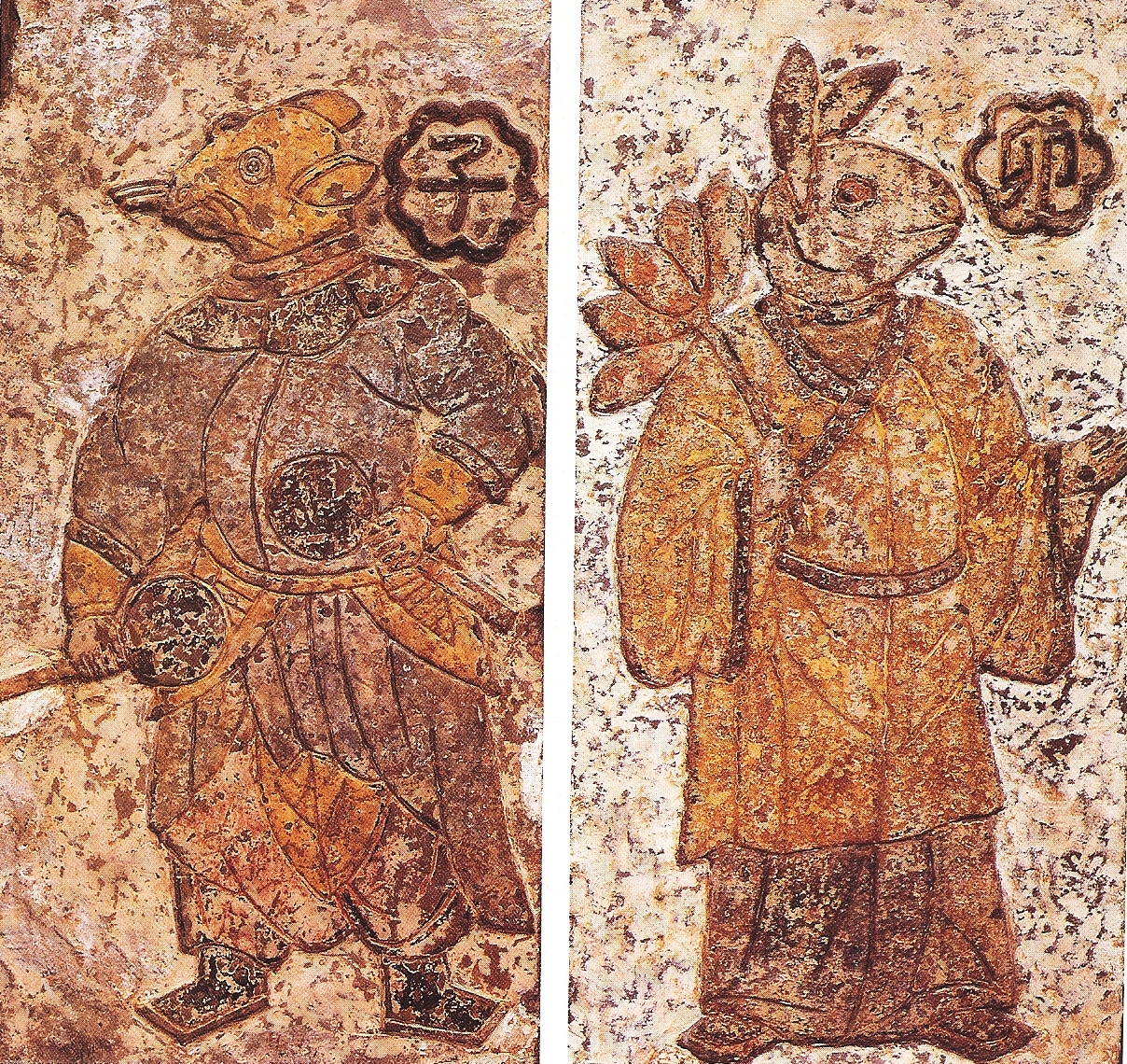
Left: A fragmentary Daoist manuscript from the 2nd century BC, ink on silk, Mawangdui tomb #3
Right: Anthropomorphized animalistic guardian spirits of day and night wearing Han-era robes, Han-era paintings on ceramic tile; Michael Loewe writes that the hybrid of man and beast in art and religious beliefs predated the Han and remained popular during the first half of Western Han and the Eastern Han.

Families throughout Han China made ritual sacrifices of animals and food to deities, spirits, and ancestors at temples and shrines. They believed that these items could be used by those in the spiritual realm. It was thought that each person had a two-part soul: the spirit-soul which journeyed to the afterlife paradise of immortals (xian), and the body-soul which remained in its grave or tomb on earth and was only reunited with the spirit-soul through a ritual ceremony.

In addition to his many other roles, the emperor acted as the highest priest in the land who made sacrifices to Heaven, the main deities known as the Five Powers, and spirits of mountains and rivers known as shen. It was believed that the three realms of Heaven, Earth, and Mankind were linked by natural cycles of yin and yang and the five phases. If the emperor did not behave according to proper ritual, ethics, and morals, he could disrupt the fine balance of these cosmological cycles and cause calamities such as earthquakes, floods, droughts, epidemics, and swarms of locusts.

It was believed that immortality could be achieved if one reached the lands of the Queen Mother of the West or Mount Penglai. Han-era Taoists assembled into small groups of hermits who attempted to achieve immortality through breathing exercises, sexual techniques, and the use of medical elixirs.

By the 2nd century AD, Taoists formed large hierarchical religious societies such as the Way of the Five Pecks of Rice. Its followers believed that the sage-philosopher Laozi (fl. 6th century BC) was a holy prophet who would offer salvation and good health if his devout followers would confess their sins, ban the worship of unclean gods who accepted meat sacrifices, and chant sections of the Tao Te Ching.

Buddhism first entered Imperial China through the Silk Road during the Eastern Han, and was first mentioned in 65 AD. Liu Ying (d. 71 AD), a half-brother to Emperor Ming of Han (r. 57–75 AD), was one of its earliest Chinese adherents, although Chinese Buddhism at this point was heavily associated with Huang–Lao Taoism. China's first known Buddhist temple, the White Horse Temple, was constructed outside the wall of Luoyang during Emperor Ming's reign. Important Buddhist canons were translated into Chinese during the 2nd century AD, including the Sutra of Forty-two Chapters, Perfection of Wisdom, Shurangama Sutra, and Pratyutpanna Sutra. (Note: See also Needham (1972), p. 112.)

== Government and politics ==
=== Central government ===
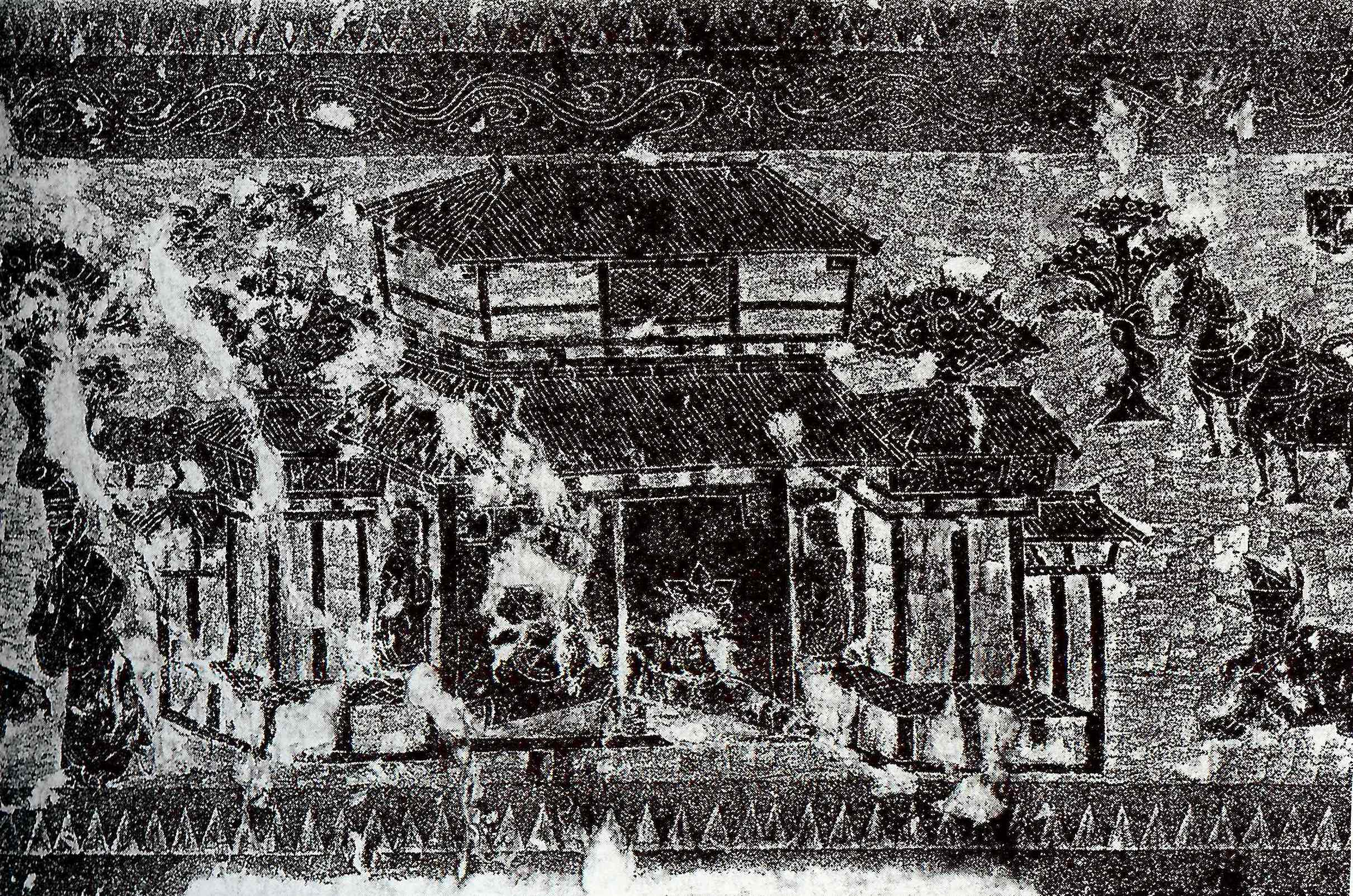
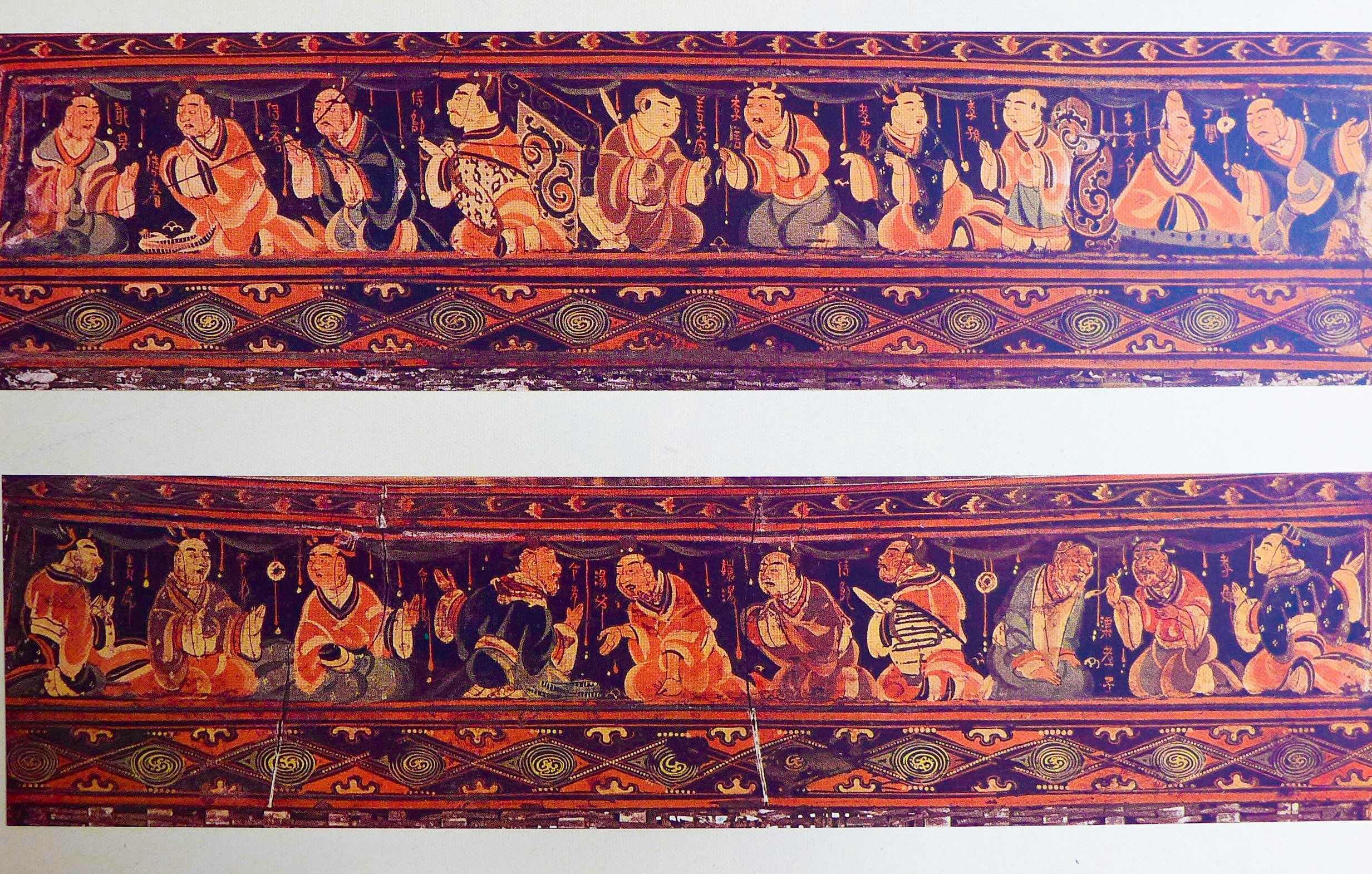
Left: A rubbing of a Han pictorial stone showing an ancestor worship hall (cítang 祠堂)
Right: A scene of historic paragons of filial piety conversing with one another, Chinese painted artwork on a lacquerware basketwork box, excavated from a tomb of the Lelang Commandery on the Korean Peninsula dating to the Eastern Han

In Han government, the emperor was the supreme judge and lawgiver, the commander-in-chief of the armed forces and sole designator of official nominees appointed to the top posts in central and local administrations; those who earned a 600-bushel salary-rank or higher. Theoretically, there were no limits to his power.

However, state organs with competing interests and institutions such as the court conference (tingyi 廷議)—where ministers were convened to reach a majority consensus on an issue—pressured the emperor to accept the advice of his ministers on policy decisions. If the emperor rejected a court conference decision, he risked alienating his high ministers. Nevertheless, emperors sometimes did reject the majority opinion reached at court conferences.

Below the emperor were his cabinet members known as the Three Councillors of State. These were the Chancellor or Minister over the Masses, the Imperial Counsellor or Excellency of Works (Yushi dafu 御史大夫 or Da sikong 大司空), and Grand Commandant or Grand Marshal (Taiwei 太尉 or Da sima 大司馬).

The Chancellor, whose title had changed in 8 BC to Minister over the Masses, was chiefly responsible for drafting the government budget. The Chancellor's other duties included managing provincial registers for land and population, leading court conferences, acting as judge in lawsuits, and recommending nominees for high office. He could appoint officials below the salary-rank of 600 bushels.

The Imperial Counsellor's chief duty was to conduct disciplinary procedures for officials. He shared similar duties with the Chancellor, such as receiving annual provincial reports. However, when his title was changed to Minister of Works in 8 BC, his chief duty became the oversight of public works projects.

The Grand Commandant, whose title was changed to Grand Marshal in 119 BC before reverting to Grand Commandant in 51 AD, was the irregularly posted commander of the military and then regent during the Western Han period. In the Eastern Han era he was chiefly a civil official who shared many of the same censorial powers as the other two Councillors of State.

Ranked below the Three Councillors of State were the Nine Ministers, who each headed a specialized ministry. The Minister of Ceremonies (Taichang 太常) was the chief official in charge of religious rites, rituals, prayers, and the maintenance of ancestral temples and altars. The Minister of the Household (Guang lu xun, 光祿勳) was in charge of the emperor's security within the palace grounds, external imperial parks, and wherever the emperor made an outing by chariot.

The Minister of the Guards (Weiwei 衛尉) was responsible for securing and patrolling the walls, towers, and gates of the imperial palaces. The Minister Coachman (Taipu 太僕) was responsible for the maintenance of imperial stables, horses, carriages, and coach-houses for the emperor and his palace attendants, as well as the supply of horses for the armed forces. The Minister of Justice (Tingwei 廷尉) was the chief official in charge of upholding, administering, and interpreting the law. The Minister Herald (Da honglu 大鴻臚) was the chief official in charge of receiving honoured guests like nobles and foreign ambassadors at court.

The Minister of the Imperial Clan (Zongzheng, 宗正) oversaw the imperial court's interactions with the empire's nobility and extended imperial family, such as granting fiefs and titles. The Minister of Finance (da sìnong, 大司農) was the treasurer for the official bureaucracy and the armed forces who handled tax revenues and set standards for units of measurement. The Minister Steward (Shaofu 少府) served the emperor exclusively, providing him with entertainment and amusements, proper food and clothing, medicine and physical care, valuables and equipment.

=== Local government ===
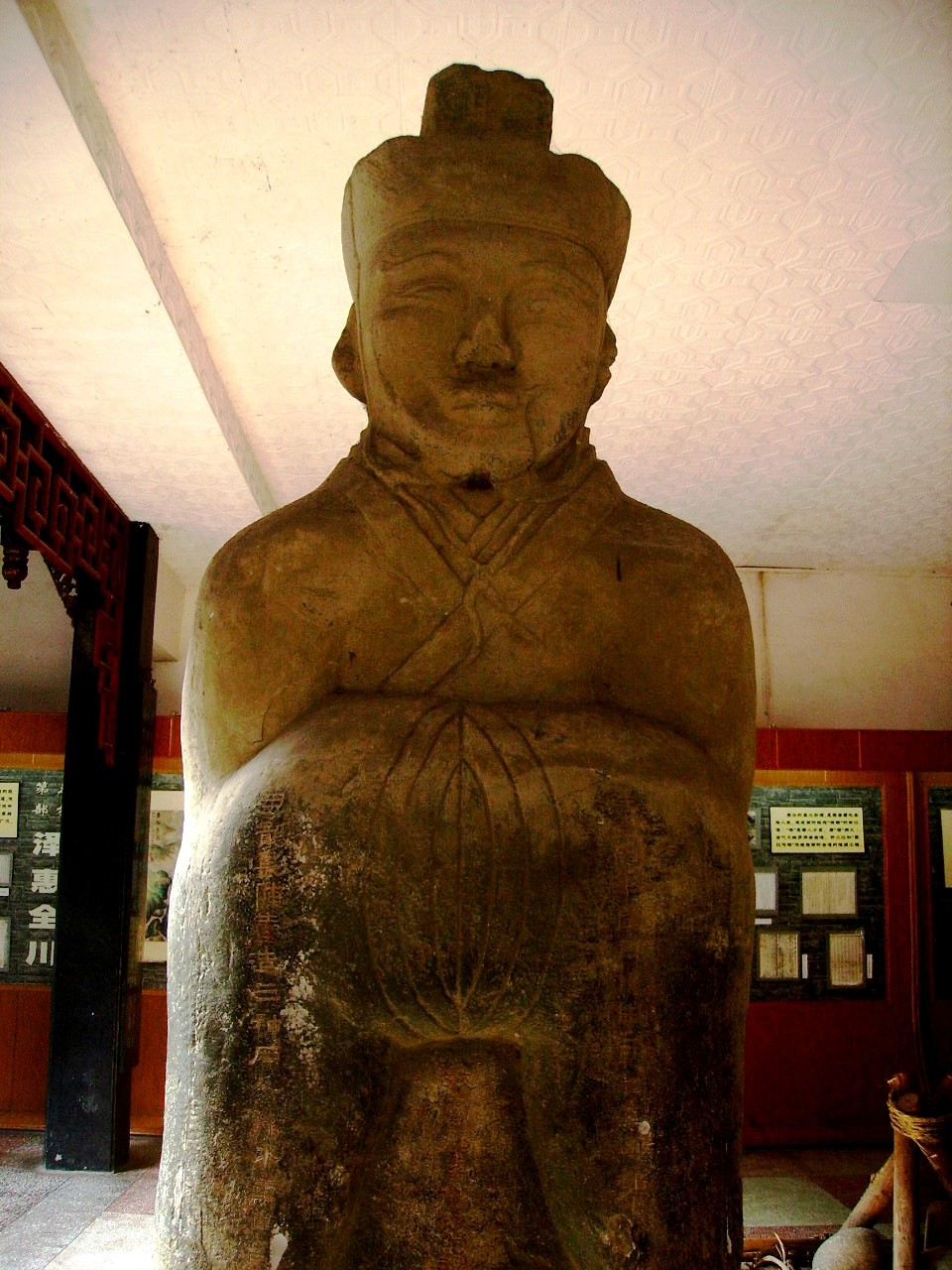
An Eastern Han devotional stone statue depicting Li Bing (fl. 3rd century BC) in an official's cap and robe in Dujiangyan, Sichuan

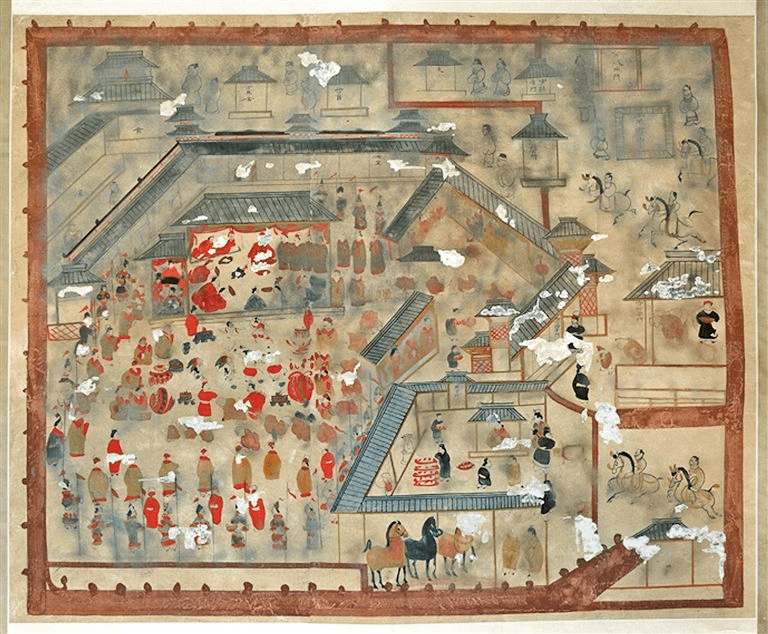
An Eastern Han (25–220) period Chinese mural of a mufu conference conducted by the Commandant-protector of the Wuhuan (护乌桓校尉) at his manor, from a Han tomb in Horinger, Inner Mongolia

The Han empire, excluding kingdoms and marquessates, was divided, in descending order of size, into political units of provinces, commanderies, and counties. A county was divided into several districts (xiang, 鄉), the latter composed of a group of hamlets (li, 里), each containing about a hundred families.

The heads of provinces, whose official title was changed from Inspector to Governor and vice versa several times during Han, were responsible for inspecting several commandery-level and kingdom-level administrations. On the basis of their reports, the officials in these local administrations would be promoted, demoted, dismissed, or prosecuted by the imperial court.

A governor could take various actions without permission from the imperial court. The lower-ranked inspector had executive powers only during times of crisis, such as raising militias across the commanderies under his jurisdiction to suppress a rebellion.

A commandery consisted of a group of counties, and was headed by an administrator. He was the top civil and military leader of the commandery and handled defence, lawsuits, seasonal instructions to farmers, and recommendations of nominees for office sent annually to the capital in a quota system first established by Emperor Wu. The head of a large county of about 10,000 households was called a Prefect, while the heads of smaller counties were called chiefs, and both could be referred to as magistrates. A Magistrate maintained law and order in his county, registered the populace for taxation, mobilized commoners for annual corvée duties, repaired schools, and supervised public works.

=== Kingdoms and marquessates ===
Kingdoms—roughly the size of commanderies—were ruled exclusively by the emperor's male relatives as semi-autonomous fiefdoms. Before 157 BC, some kingdoms were ruled by non-relatives, granted to them in return for their services to Emperor Gaozu. The administration of each kingdom was very similar to that of the central government. Although the emperor appointed the Chancellor of each kingdom, kings appointed all the remaining civil officials in their fiefs.

However, in 145 BC, after several insurrections by the kings, Emperor Jing removed the kings' rights to appoint officials whose salaries were higher than 400 bushels. The Imperial Counsellors and Nine Ministers (excluding the Minister Coachman) of every kingdom were abolished, although the Chancellor was still appointed by the central government.

With these reforms, kings were reduced to being nominal heads of their fiefs, gaining a personal income from only a portion of the taxes collected in their kingdom. Similarly, the officials in the administrative staff of a full marquess's fief were appointed by the central government. A marquess's chancellor was ranked as the equivalent of a county prefect. Like a king, the marquess collected a portion of the tax revenues in his fief as personal income.

Until the reign of Emperor Jing of Han, the Han emperors had great difficulties controlling their vassal kings, who often switched allegiances to the Xiongnu whenever they felt threatened by imperial centralization of power. The seven years of Gaozu's reign featured defections by three vassal kings and one marquess, who then aligned themselves with the Xiongnu. Even imperial princes controlling fiefdoms would sometimes invite a Xiongnu invasion in response to the Emperor's threats. The Han moved to secure a treaty with the Xiongnu, aiming to clearly divide authority between them. The Han and Xiongnu now held one another out as the "two masters" with sole dominion over their respective peoples; they cemented this agreement with a marriage alliance (heqin), before eliminating the rebellious vassal kings in 154 BC. This prompted some of the Xiongnu vassals to swap allegiances to the Han, starting in 147. Han court officials were initially hostile to the idea of disrupting the status quo by expanding into Xiongnu territory in the steppe. The surrendered Xiongnu were integrated into a parallel military and political structures loyal to the Han emperor, a step toward a potential Han challenge to the superiority of Xiongnu cavalry in steppe warfare. This also brought the Han into contact with the interstate trade networks through the Tarim Basin in the far northwest, allowing for the Han's expansion from a regional state to a universalist, cosmopolitan empire achieved in part through further marriage alliances with the Wusun, another steppe power.

=== Military ===
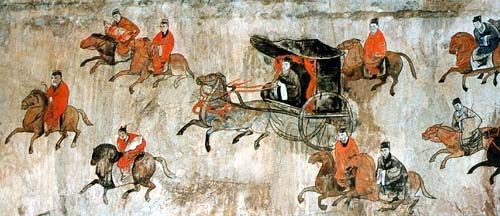
A mural showing chariots and cavalry from the Dahuting tomb near Zhengzhou, Henan, dated to the late Eastern Han

At the beginning of the Han, every male commoner aged twenty-three was liable for conscription into the military. The minimum age was reduced to twenty following the reign of Emperor Zhao (r. 87–74). Conscripted soldiers underwent one year of training and one year of service as non-professional soldiers. The year of training was spent in one of three branches of the armed forces: infantry, cavalry, or navy. Prior to the abolition of much of the conscription system after 30 AD, soldiers could be called up for future service following the completion of their terms. They had to continue training regularly to maintain their skills, and were subject to annual inspections of their military readiness. The year of active service was served either on the frontier, in a king's court, or in the capital under the Minister of the Guards. A small professional army was stationed near the capital.

During the Eastern Han, conscription could be avoided if one paid a commutable tax. The Eastern Han court favoured the recruitment of a volunteer army. The volunteer army comprised the Southern Army (Nanjun 南軍), while the standing army stationed in and near the capital was the Northern Army (Beijun 北軍). Led by Colonels (Xiaowei, 校尉), the Northern Army consisted of five regiments, each composed of several thousand soldiers. When central authority collapsed after 189 AD, wealthy landowners, members of the aristocracy/nobility, and regional military-governors relied upon their retainers to act as their own personal troops.

During times of war, the volunteer army was increased, and a much larger militia was raised across the country to supplement the Northern Army. In these circumstances, a general (jiangjun 將軍) led a division, which was divided into regiments led by a colonel or major (sima 司馬). Regiments were divided into companies and led by captains. Platoons were the smallest units.

== Economy ==
=== Currency ===
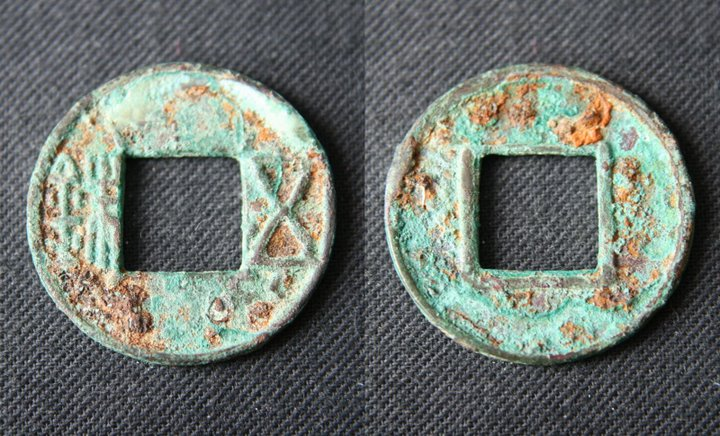
A wuzhu (五銖) coin issued during the reign of Emperor Wu (r. 141–87 BC), 25.5 mm in diameter

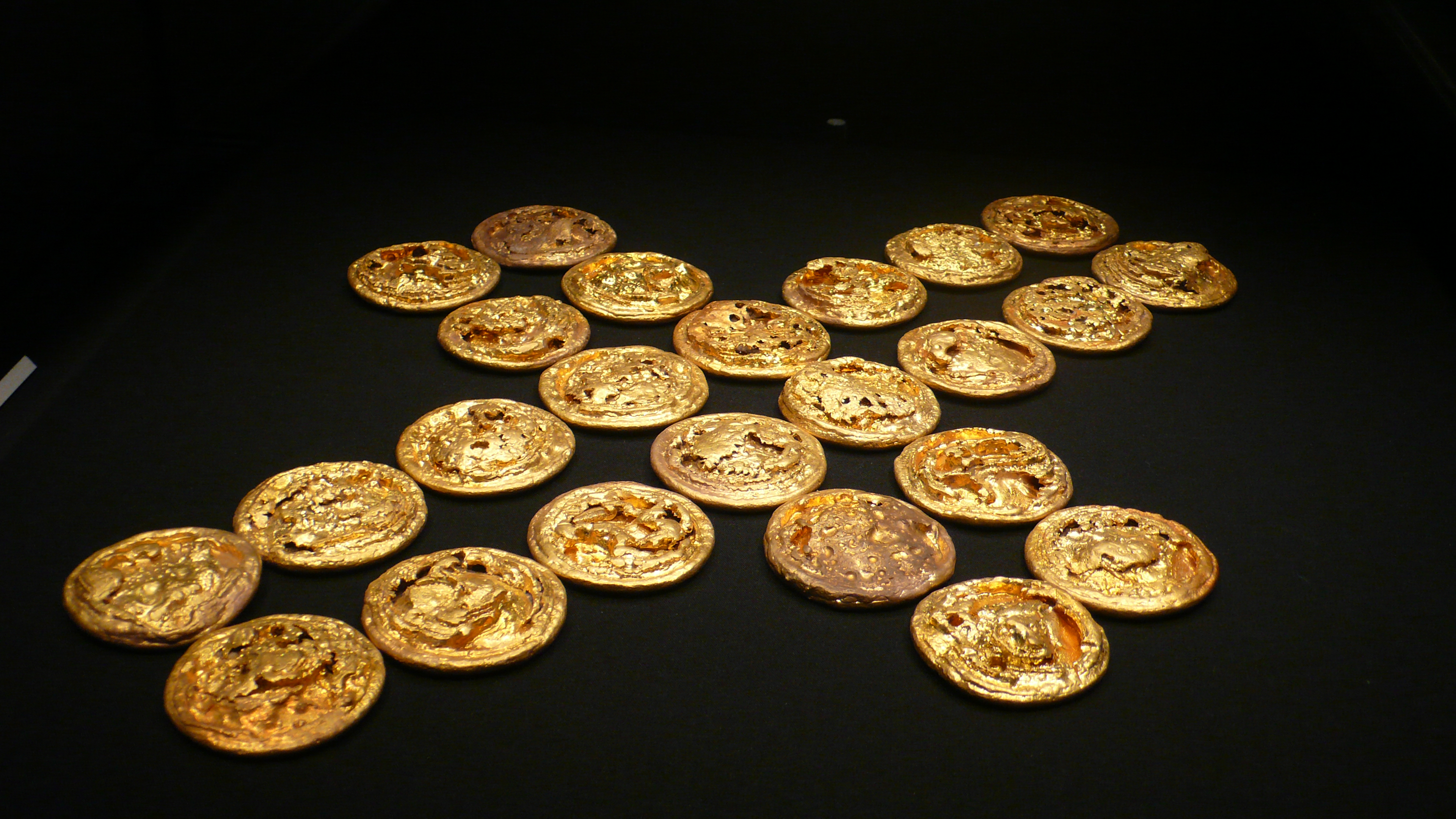
Gold coins from the Eastern Han

The Han dynasty inherited the ban liang coin type from the Qin. In the beginning of the Han, Emperor Gaozu closed the government mint in favour of private minting of coins. This decision was reversed in 186 BC by his widow Grand Empress Dowager Lü Zhi (d. 180 BC), who abolished private minting. In 182 BC, Lü Zhi issued a bronze coin that was much lighter in weight than previous coins. This caused widespread inflation that was not reduced until 175 BC, when Emperor Wen allowed private minters to manufacture coins that were precisely 2.6 g (0.092 oz) in weight.

In 144 BC, Emperor Jing abolished private minting in favour of central-government and commandery-level minting; he also introduced a new coin. Emperor Wu introduced another in 120 BC, but a year later he abandoned the ban liangs entirely in favour of the wuzhu coin, weighing 3.2 g (0.11 oz). The wuzhu became China's standard coin until the Tang dynasty (618–907). Its use was interrupted briefly by several new currencies introduced during Wang Mang's regime until it was reinstated in 40 AD by Emperor Guangwu.

Since commandery-issued coins were often of inferior quality and lighter weight, the central government closed commandery mints and monopolized the issue of coinage in 113 BC. This central government issuance of coinage was overseen by the Superintendent of Waterways and Parks, this duty being transferred to the Minister of Finance during the Eastern Han.

=== Taxation and property ===
Aside from the landowner's land tax paid in a portion of their crop yield, the poll tax and property taxes were paid in coin cash. The annual poll tax rate for adult men and women was 120 coins and 20 coins for minors. Merchants were required to pay a higher rate of 240 coins. The poll tax stimulated a money economy that necessitated the minting of over 28,000,000,000 coins from 118 BC to 5 AD, an average of 220,000,000 coins a year.

The widespread circulation of coin cash allowed successful merchants to invest money in land, empowering the very social class the government attempted to suppress through heavy commercial and property taxes. Emperor Wu even enacted laws which banned registered merchants from owning land, yet powerful merchants were able to avoid registration and own large tracts of land.

The small landowner-cultivators formed the majority of the Han tax base; this revenue was threatened during the latter half of Eastern Han when many peasants fell into debt and were forced to work as farming tenants for wealthy landlords. The Han government enacted reforms in order to keep small landowner-cultivators out of debt and on their own farms. These reforms included reducing taxes, temporary remissions of taxes, granting loans, and providing landless peasants temporary lodging and work in agricultural colonies until they could recover from their debts.

In 168 BC, the land tax rate was reduced from one-fifteenth of a farming household's crop yield to one-thirtieth, and later to one-hundredth of a crop yield for the last decades of the dynasty. The consequent loss of government revenue was compensated for by increasing property taxes.

The labour tax took the form of conscripted labour for one month per year, which was imposed upon male commoners aged fifteen to fifty-six. This could be avoided in Eastern Han with a commutable tax, since hired labour became more popular.

=== Private manufacture and government monopolies ===
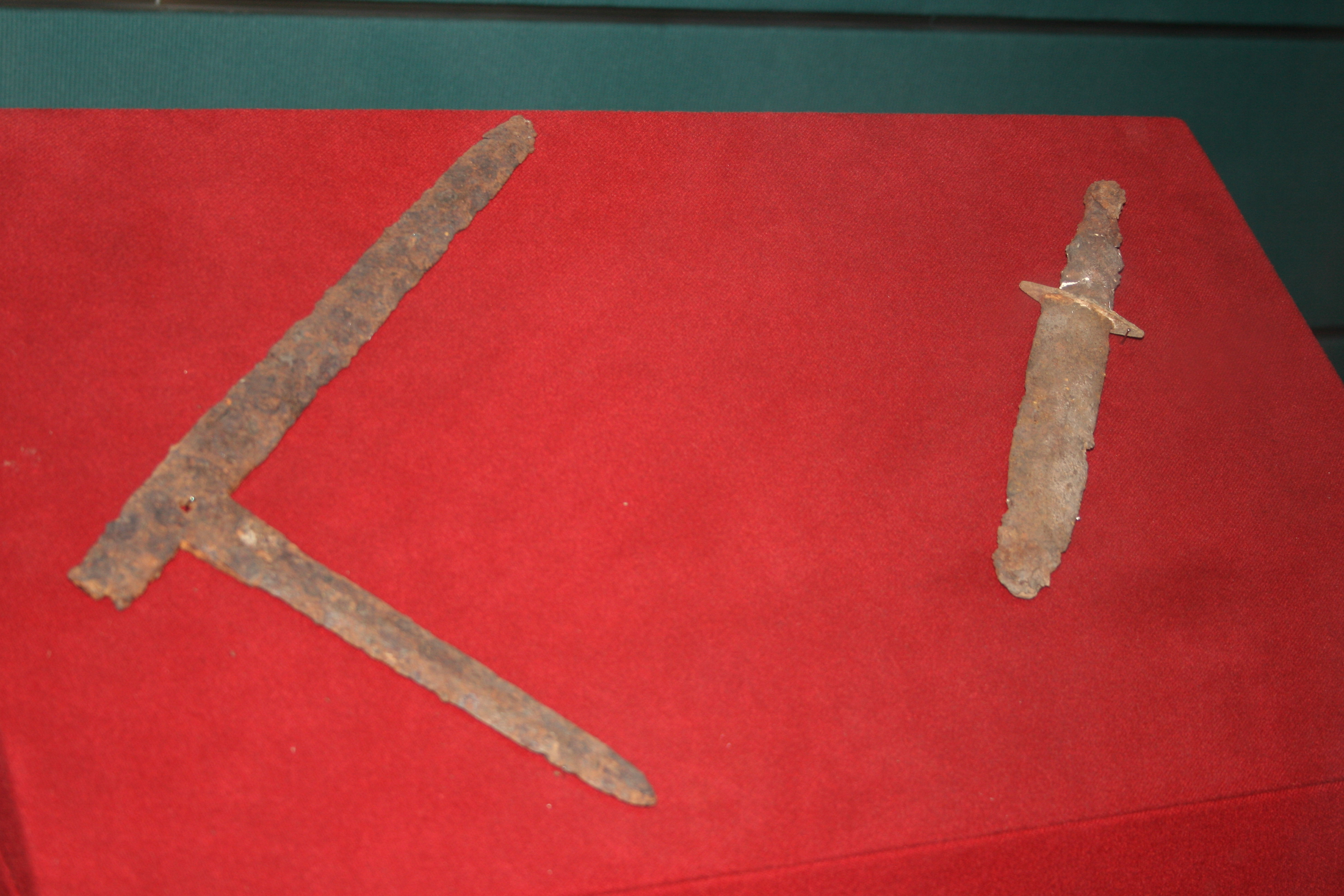
An iron ji polearm and iron dagger

In the early Western Han, a wealthy salt or iron industrialist, whether a semi-autonomous king or wealthy merchant, could boast funds that rivalled the imperial treasury and amass a peasant workforce numbering in the thousands. This kept many peasants away from their farms and denied the government a significant portion of its land tax revenue. To eliminate the influence of such private entrepreneurs, Emperor Wu nationalized the salt and iron industries in 117 BC and allowed many of the former industrialists to become officials administering the state monopolies. By the Eastern Han, the central government monopolies were repealed in favour of production by commandery and county administrations, as well as private businessmen.

Liquor was another profitable private industry nationalized by the central government in 98 BC. However, this was repealed in 81 BC and a property tax rate of two coins for every 0.2 litres (0.053 US gal) was levied for those who traded it privately. By 110 BC, Emperor Wu also interfered with the profitable trade in grain when he eliminated speculation by selling government stores of grain at a lower price than that demanded by merchants. Apart from Emperor Ming's creation of a short-lived Office for Price Adjustment and Stabilization, which was abolished in 68 AD, central-government price control regulations were largely absent during the Eastern Han.

== Science and technology ==
A gilded bronze oil lamp in the shape of a kneeling female servant, dated to the 2nd century BC, found in the tomb of Dou Wan, wife of Liu Sheng, Prince of Zhongshan; its sliding shutter allows for adjustments in the direction and brightness in light while it also traps smoke within the body.

The Han dynasty was a unique period in the development of premodern Chinese science and technology, comparable to the level of scientific and technological growth during the Song dynasty (960–1279).

=== Writing materials ===
In the 1st millennium BC, typical ancient Chinese writing materials were bronzeware, oracle bones, and bamboo slips or wooden boards. By the beginning of the Han, the chief writing materials were clay tablets, silk cloth, hemp paper, and rolled scrolls made from bamboo strips sewn together with hempen string; these were passed through drilled holes and secured with clay stamps.

The oldest known Chinese piece of hempen paper dates to the 2nd century BC. The standard papermaking process was invented by Cai Lun (AD 50–121) in 105. The oldest known surviving piece of paper with writing on it was found in the ruins of a Han watchtower that had been abandoned in AD 110, in Inner Mongolia.

=== Metallurgy and agriculture ===
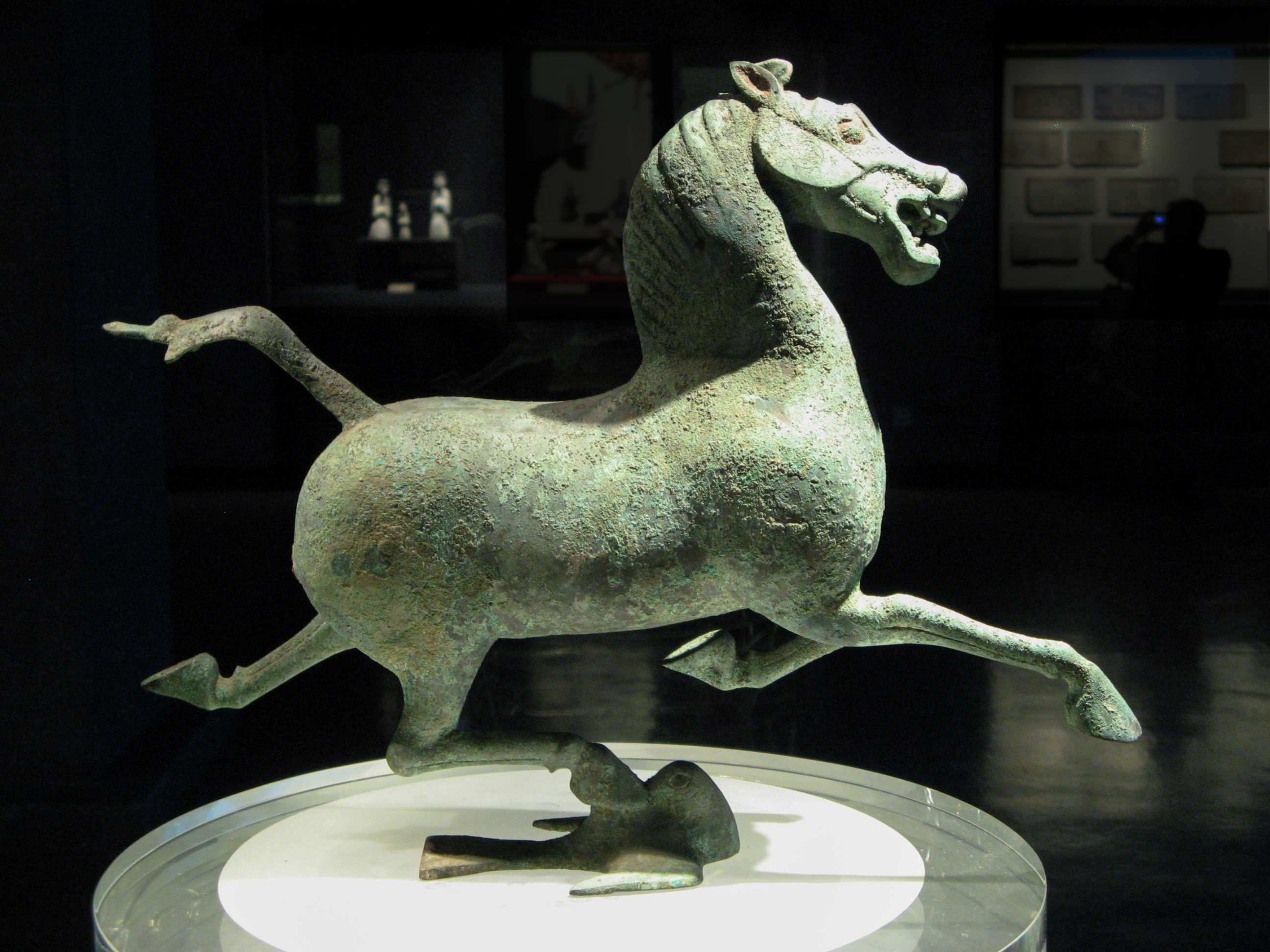
The Flying Horse of Gansu, depicted in full gallop, bronze sculpture 34.5 cm in height. Wuwei, Gansu (25–220 AD)

Evidence suggests that blast furnaces, that convert raw iron ore into pig iron, which can be remelted in a cupola furnace to produce cast iron by means of a cold blast and hot blast, were operational in China by the late Spring and Autumn period (c. 770 – c. 481 BC). The bloomery was non-existent in ancient China; however, the Han-era Chinese produced wrought iron by injecting excess oxygen into a furnace and causing decarburisation. Cast iron and pig iron could be converted into wrought iron and steel using a fining process.

The Han dynasty Chinese used bronze and iron to make a range of weapons, culinary tools, carpenters' tools, and domestic wares. A significant product of these improved iron-smelting techniques was the manufacture of new agricultural tools. The three-legged iron seed drill, invented by the 2nd century BC, enabled farmers to carefully plant crops in rows instead of sowing seeds by hand. The heavy mouldboard iron plough, also invented during the Han, required only one man to control it with two oxen to pull it. It had three ploughshares, a seed box for the drills, a tool which turned down the soil and could sow roughly 45,730 m^{2} (492,200 sq ft) of land in a single day.

To protect crops from wind and drought, the grain intendant Zhao Guo (趙過) created the alternating fields system (daitianfa 代田法) during Emperor Wu's reign. This system switched the positions of furrows and ridges between growing seasons. Once experiments with this system yielded successful results, the government officially sponsored it and encouraged peasants to use it. Han farmers also used the pit field system (aotian 凹田) for growing crops, which involved heavily fertilized pits that did not require ploughs or oxen and could be placed on sloping terrain. In the southern and small parts of central Han-era China, paddy fields were chiefly used to grow rice, while farmers along the Huai River used transplantation methods of rice production.

=== Structural and geo-technical engineering ===
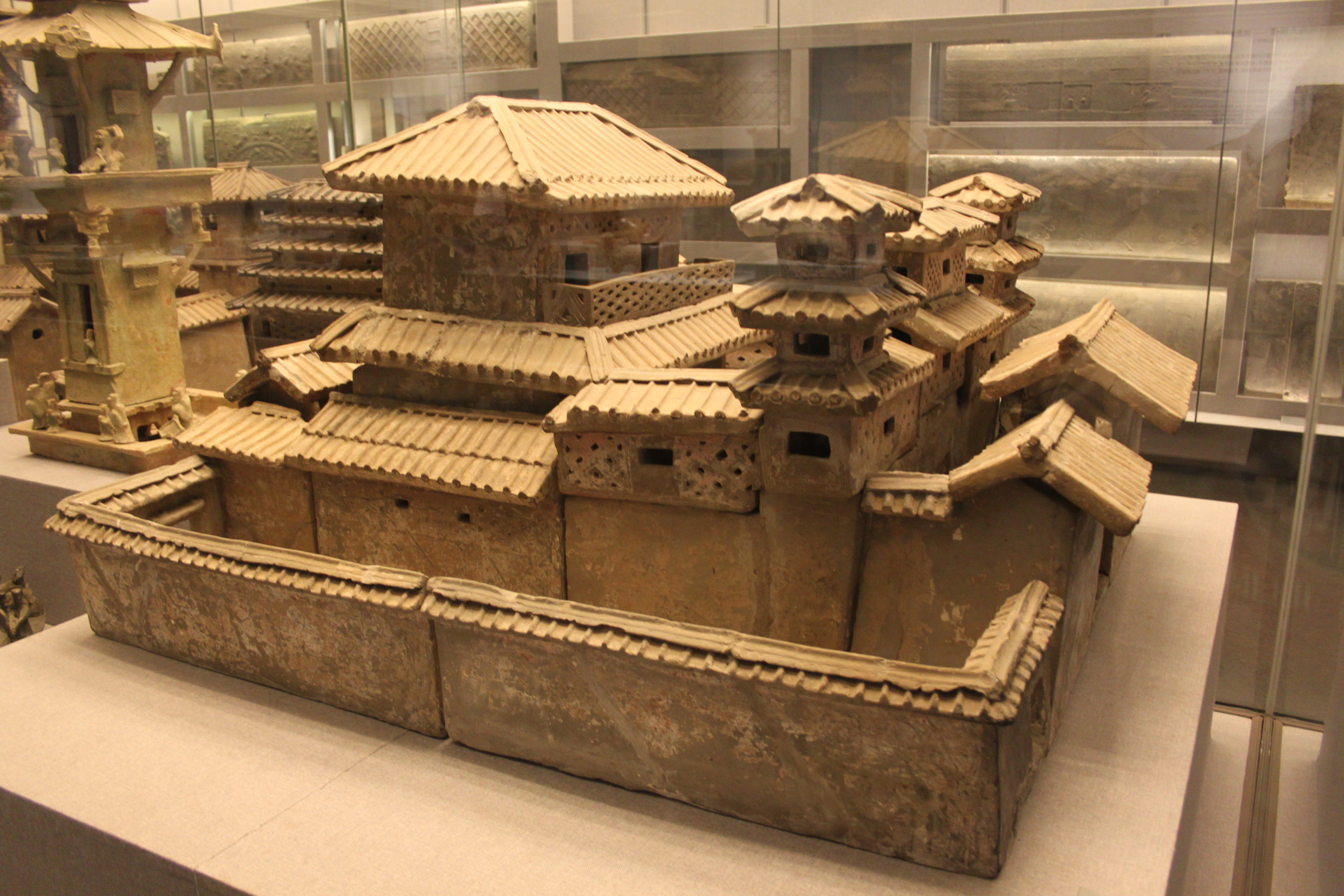
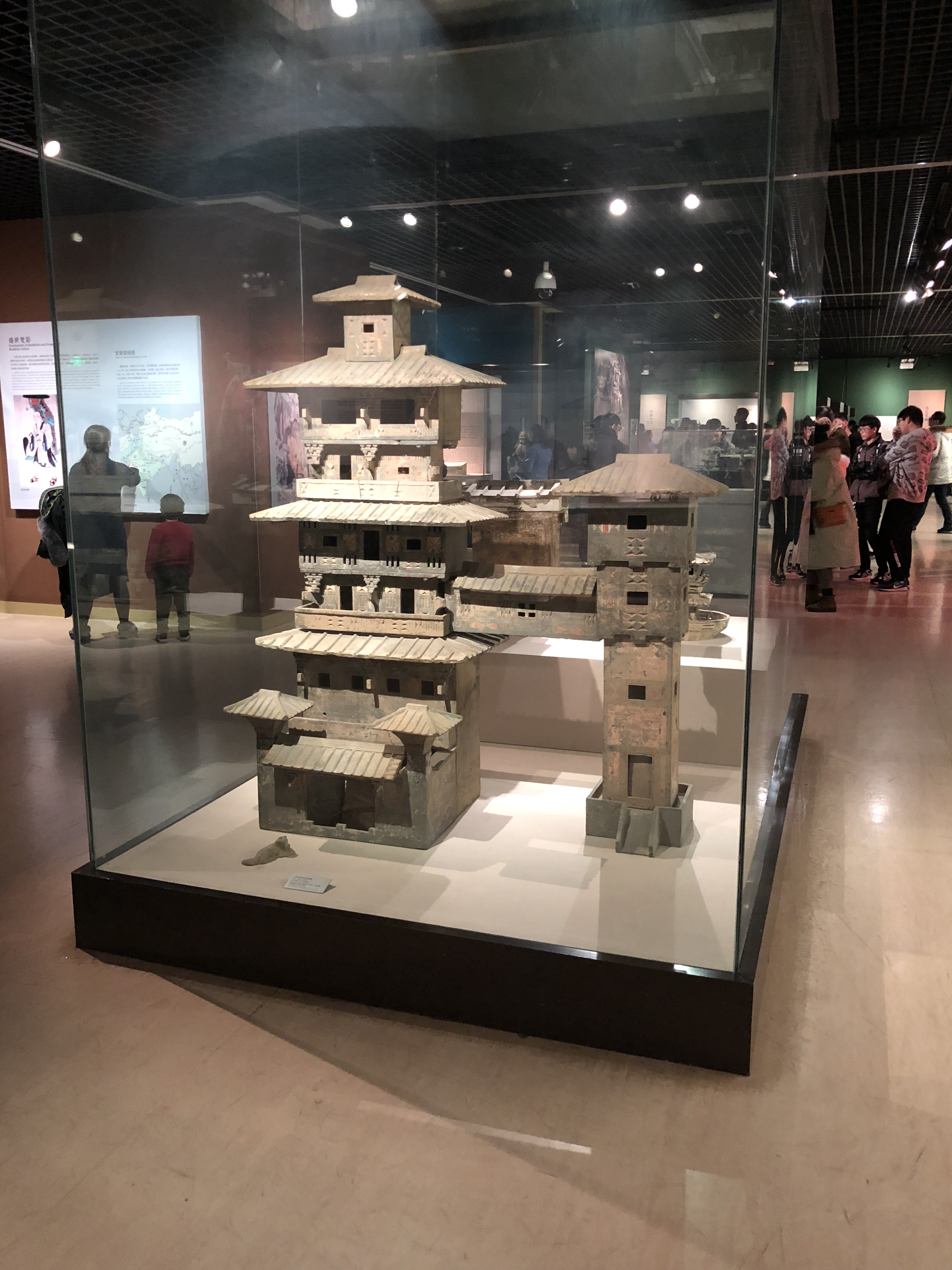
Left: A pottery model of a palace from a Han dynasty tomb; the entrances to the emperor's palaces were strictly guarded by the Minister of the Guards; if it was found that a commoner, official, or noble entered without explicit permission via a tally system, the intruder was subject to execution.
Right: A painted ceramic architectural model depicting a fortified manor with towers, a courtyard, verandas, tiled rooftops, dougong support brackets, and a covered bridge extending from the third floor of the main tower to the smaller watchtower, found in an Eastern Han tomb at Jiazuo, Henan

Timber was the chief building material during the Han; it was used to build palace halls, multi-story residential towers and halls, and single-story houses. Because wood decays rapidly, the only remaining evidence of Han wooden architecture is a collection of scattered ceramic roof tiles. The oldest surviving wooden halls in China date to the Tang dynasty. Architectural historian Robert L. Thorp points out the scarcity of Han-era archaeological remains, and claims that often unreliable Han-era literary and artistic sources are used by historians as clues concerning lost Han architecture.

Though Han wooden structures decayed, some Han dynasty ruins made of brick, stone, and rammed earth remain intact. This includes stone pillar-gates, brick tomb chambers, rammed-earth city walls, rammed-earth and brick beacon towers, rammed-earth sections of the Great Wall, rammed-earth platforms where elevated halls once stood, and two rammed-earth castles in Gansu. (Note: See also Ebrey (1999), p. 76; see Needham (1972), Plate V, Fig. 15, for a photo of a Han-era fortress in Dunhuang, Gansu that has rammed earth ramparts with defensive crenellations at the top.) The ruins of rammed-earth walls that once surrounded the capitals Chang'an and Luoyang still stand, along with their drainage systems of brick arches, ditches, and ceramic water pipes. Monumental stone pillar-gates called que, of which 29 dated to the Han survive, formed entrances of walled enclosures at shrine and tomb sites. These pillars feature artistic imitations of wooden and ceramic building components such as roof tiles, eaves, and balustrades.

The courtyard house is the most common type of home portrayed in Han artwork. Ceramic architectural models of buildings, like houses and towers, were found in Han tombs, perhaps to provide lodging for the dead in the afterlife. These provide valuable clues about lost wooden architecture. The artistic designs found on ceramic roof tiles of tower models are in some cases exact matches to Han roof tiles found at archaeological sites.

Over ten Han-era underground tombs have been found, many of them featuring archways, vaulted chambers, and domed roofs. Underground vaults and domes did not require buttress supports since they were held in place by earthen pits. The use of brick vaults and domes in aboveground Han structures is unknown.

From Han literary sources, it is known that wooden-trestle beam bridges, arch bridges, simple suspension bridges, and floating pontoon bridges existed during the Han. However, there are only two known references to arch bridges in Han literature. There is only one Han-era relief sculpture, located in Sichuan, that depicts an arch bridge.

Underground mine shafts were dug to extract metal ores, with some reaching depths of more than 100 m (330 ft). Borehole drilling and derricks were used to lift brine to iron pans where it was distilled into salt. The distillation furnaces were heated by natural gas funnelled to the surface through bamboo pipelines. It is possible that these boreholes reached a total depth of 600 m (2,000 ft).

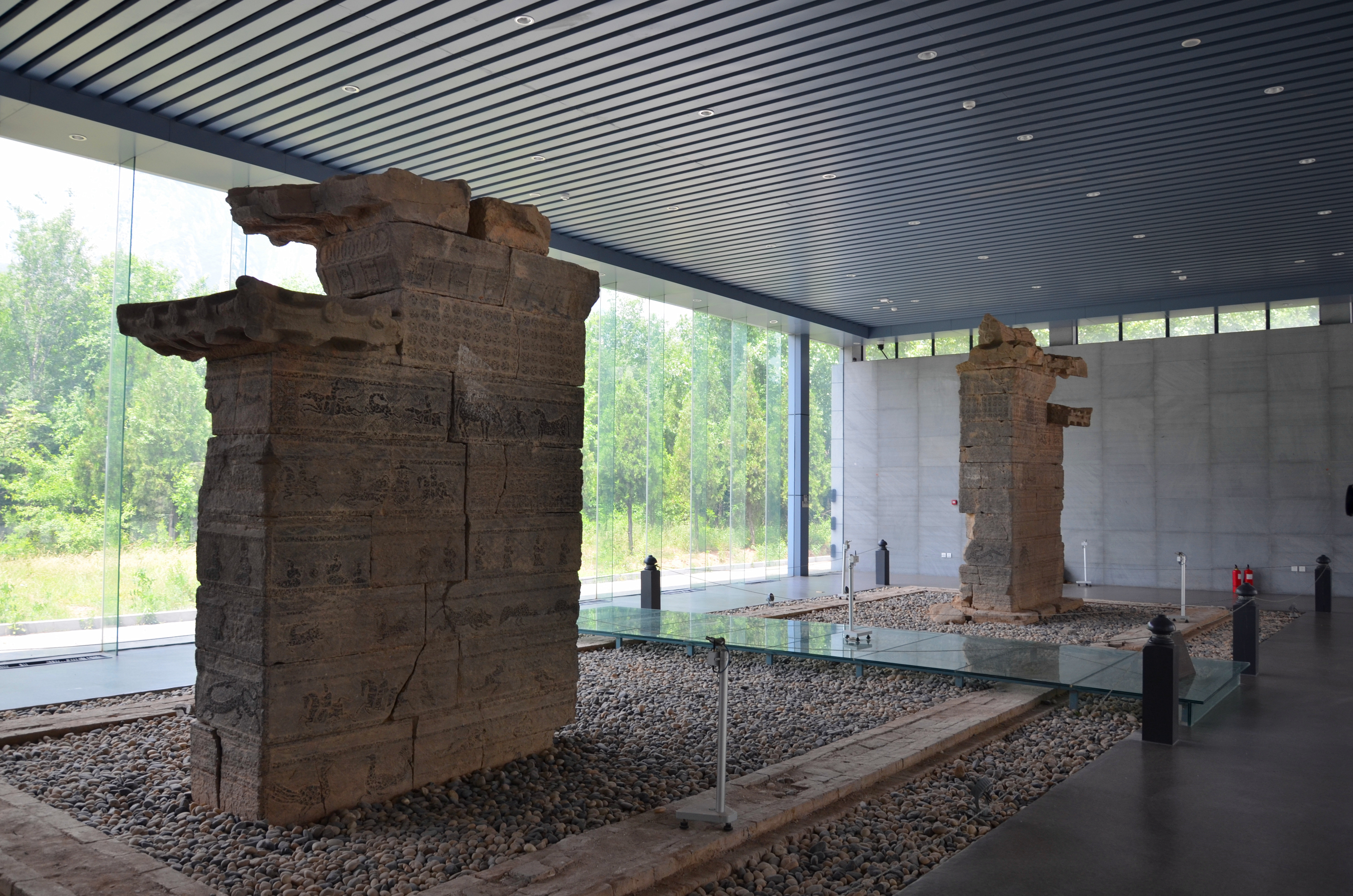
A pair of stone-carved que from the Eastern Han, at the temple of Mount Song in Dengfeng, Henan

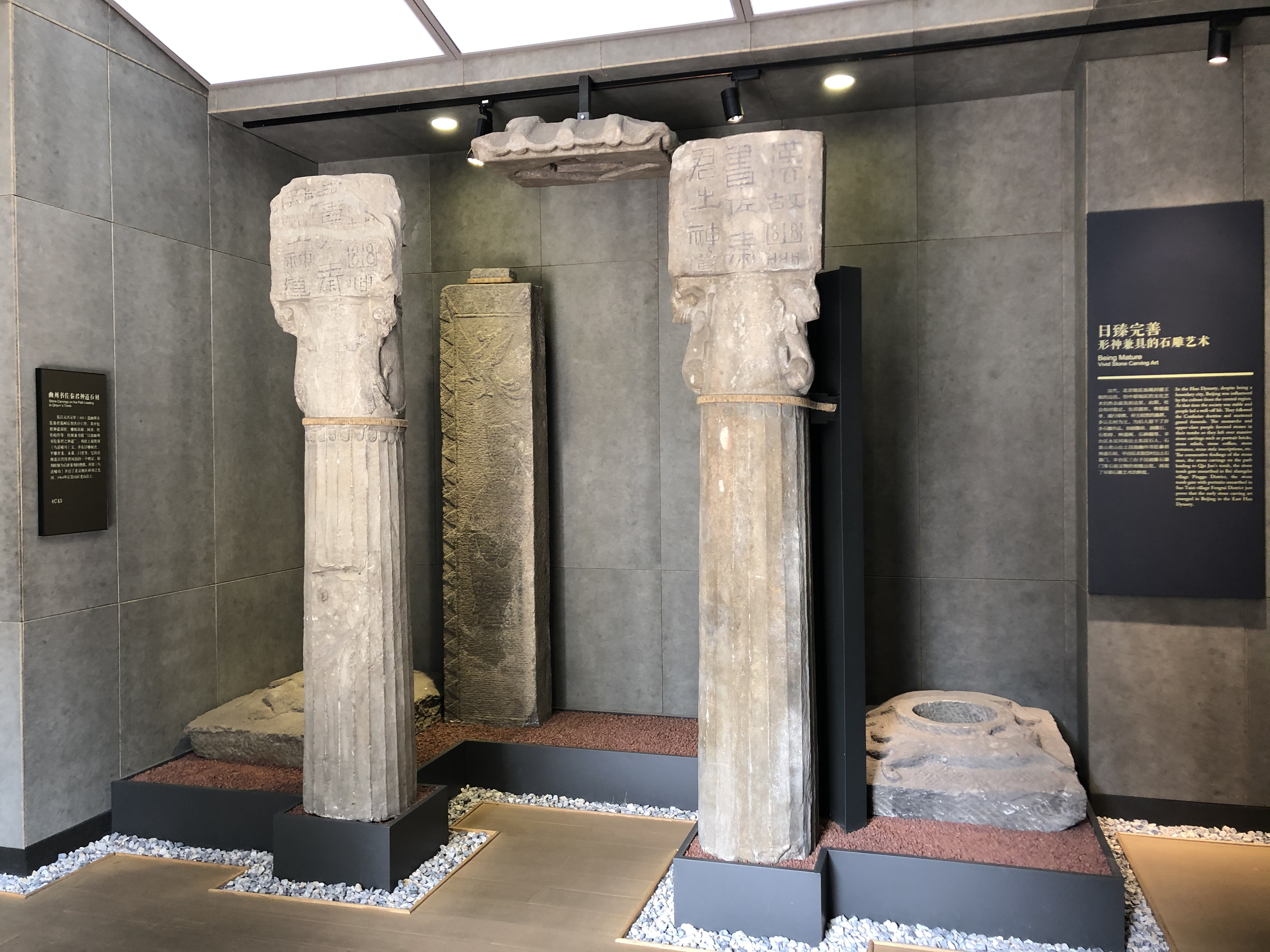
A pair of que from the Eastern Han in Babaoshan, Beijing

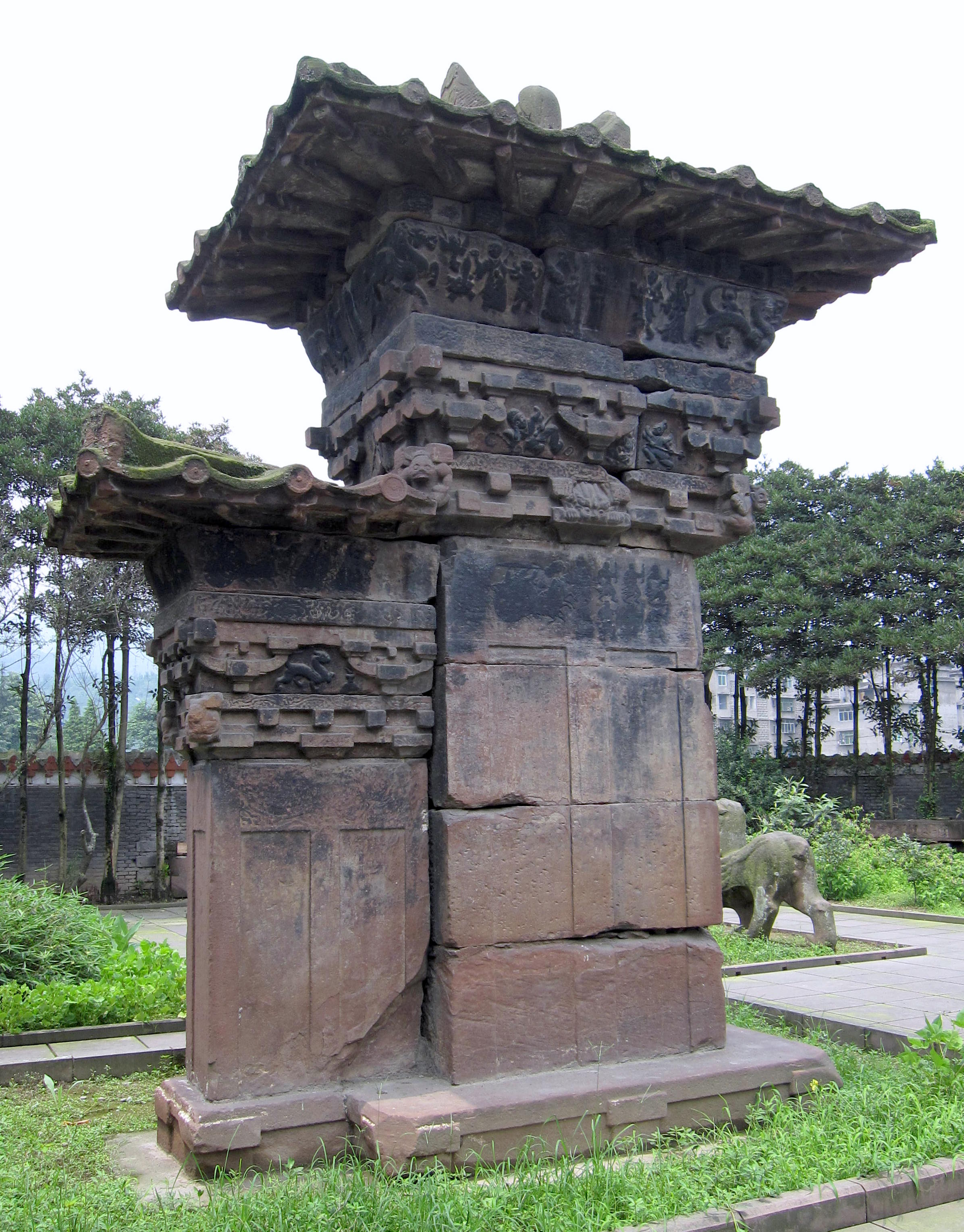
A stone-carved que 6 m (20 ft) in height from the Eastern Han, at the tomb of Gao Yi in Ya'an, Sichuan

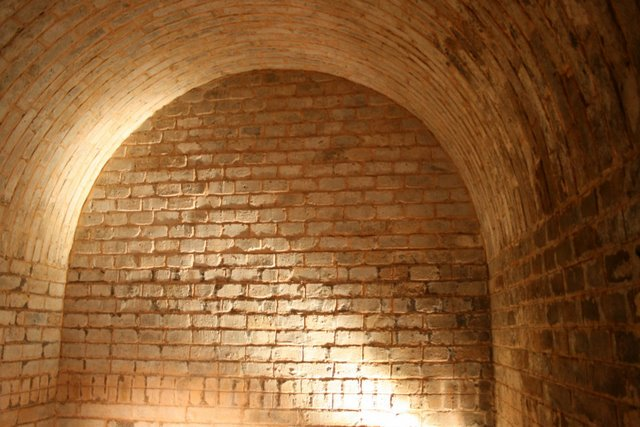
A vaulted tomb chamber made of small bricks from the Eastern Han, at Luoyang

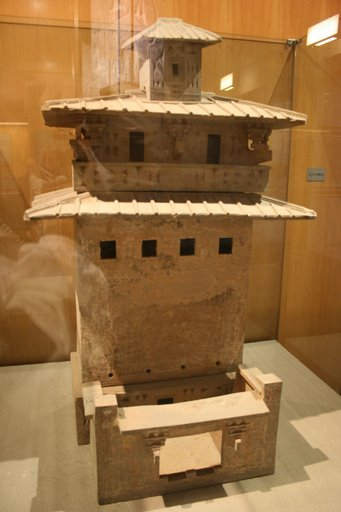
A Han pottery model of a granary tower with windows and balcony placed several stories above the first-floor courtyard; Zhang Heng (78–139 AD) described the large imperial park in the suburbs of Chang'an as having tall towers where archers would shoot stringed arrows from the top in order to entertain the Western Han emperors.

=== Mechanical and hydraulic engineering ===
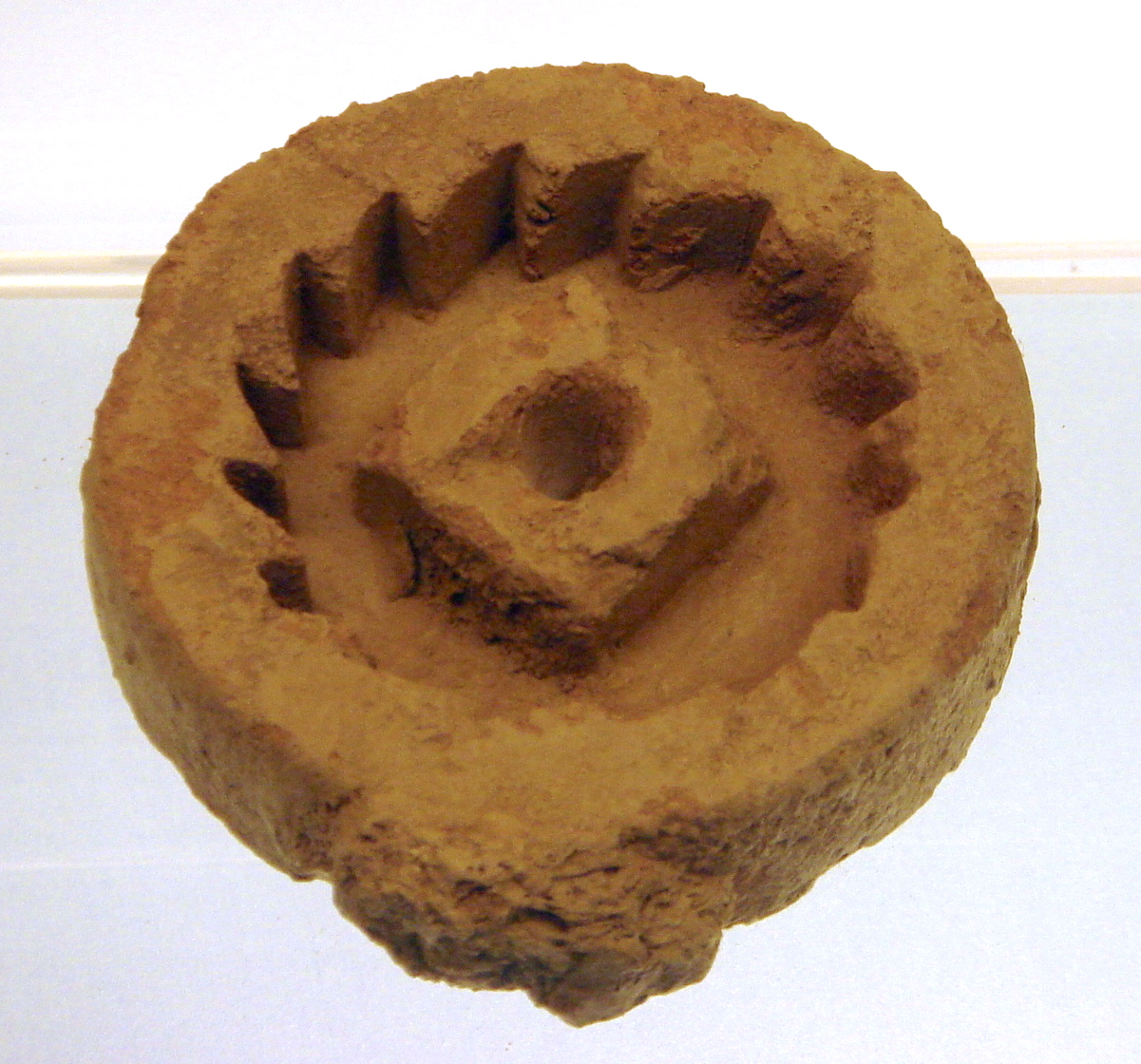
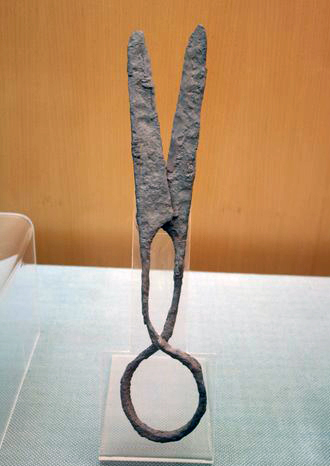
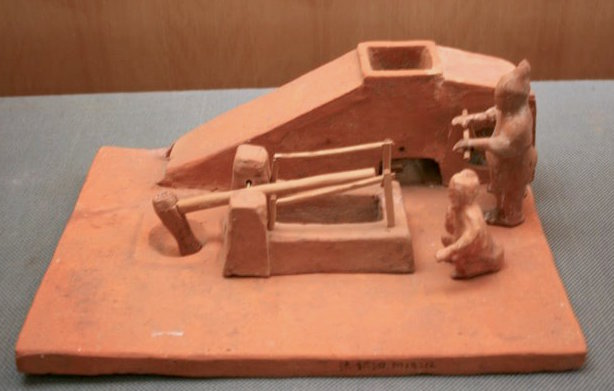
Left: A Han era mould for making bronze gear wheels – Shanghai Museum
Center: A pair of iron scissors dated to the Eastern Han period
Right: A Han dynasty pottery model of two men operating a winnowing machine with a crank handle and a tilt hammer used to pound grain

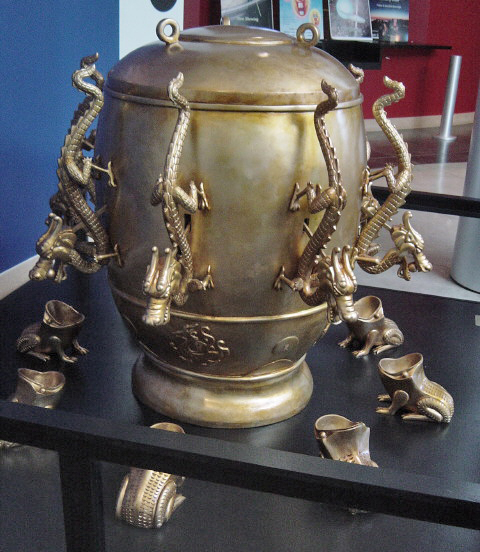
A modern replica of Zhang Heng's seismometer

Han-era mechanical engineering comes largely from the choice observational writings of sometimes-disinterested Confucian scholars who generally considered scientific and engineering endeavours to be far beneath them. Professional artisan-engineers (jiang 匠) did not leave behind detailed records of their work. (Note: See also Barbieri-Low (2007), p. 36.) Han scholars, who often had little or no expertise in mechanical engineering, sometimes provided insufficient information on the various technologies they described.

Nevertheless, some literary sources provide crucial information. For example, in 15 BC the philosopher and poet Yang Xiong described the invention of the belt drive for a quilling machine, which was of great importance to early textile manufacturing. The inventions of mechanical engineer and craftsman Ding Huan are mentioned in the Miscellaneous Notes on the Western Capital. Around AD 180, Ding created a manually operated rotary fan used for air conditioning within palace buildings. Ding also used gimbals as pivotal supports for one of his incense burners and invented the world's first known zoetrope lamp.

Modern archaeology has led to the discovery of Han artwork portraying inventions which were otherwise absent in Han literary sources. As observed in Han miniature tomb models, but not in literary sources, the crank handle was used to operate the fans of winnowing machines that separated grain from chaff. The odometer cart, invented during the Han period, measured journey lengths, using mechanical figures banging drums and gongs to indicate each distance travelled. This invention is depicted in Han artwork by the 2nd century, yet detailed written descriptions were not offered until the 3rd century.

Modern archaeologists have also unearthed specimens of devices used during the Han dynasty, for example a pair of sliding metal calipers used by craftsmen for making minute measurements. These calipers contain inscriptions of the exact day and year they were manufactured. These tools are not mentioned in any Han literary sources.

The waterwheel appeared in Chinese records during the Han. As mentioned by Huan Tan c. 20 AD, they were used to turn gears that lifted iron trip hammers, and were used in pounding, threshing, and polishing grain. However, there is no sufficient evidence for the watermill in China until around the 5th century. The administrator, mechanical engineer, and metallurgist Du Shi (d. 38 AD) created a waterwheel-powered reciprocator that worked the bellows for the smelting of iron. Waterwheels were also used to power chain pumps that lifted water to raised irrigation ditches. The chain pump was first mentioned in China by the philosopher Wang Chong in his 1st-century Lunheng.

The armillary sphere, a three-dimensional representation of the movements in the celestial sphere, was invented by the Han during the 1st century BC. Using a water clock, waterwheel, and a series of gears, the Court Astronomer Zhang Heng (78–139 AD) was able to mechanically rotate his metal-ringed armillary sphere. To address the problem of slowed timekeeping in the pressure head of the inflow water clock, Zhang was the first in China to install an additional tank between the reservoir and inflow vessel.

Zhang also invented a device he termed an "earthquake weathervane" (houfeng didong yi 候風地動儀), which the British sinologist and historian Joseph Needham described as "the ancestor of all seismographs". This device was able to detect the exact cardinal or ordinal direction of earthquakes from hundreds of kilometres away. It employed an inverted pendulum that, when disturbed by ground tremors, would trigger a set of gears that dropped a metal ball from one of eight dragon mouths (representing all eight directions) into a metal toad's mouth. The account of this device in the Book of the Later Han describes how, on one occasion, one of the metal balls was triggered without any of the observers feeling a disturbance. Several days later, a messenger arrived bearing news that an earthquake had struck in Longxi Commandery (modern Gansu), the direction the device had indicated, which forced the officials at court to admit the efficacy of Zhang's device.

=== Mathematics ===
Three Han mathematical treatises still exist. These are the Book on Numbers and Computation, the Zhoubi Suanjing, and the Nine Chapters on the Mathematical Art. Han mathematical achievements include solving problems with right triangles, square roots, cube roots, and matrix methods, finding more accurate approximations for pi, providing mathematical proof of the Pythagorean theorem, use of the decimal fraction, Gaussian elimination to solve linear equations, and continued fractions to find the roots of equations.

One of the Han's greatest mathematical advancements was the world's first use of negative numbers. Negative numbers first appeared in the Nine Chapters on the Mathematical Art as black counting rods, where positive numbers were represented by red counting rods. Negative numbers were also used by the Greek mathematician Diophantus around AD 275, and in the 7th-century Bakhshali manuscript of Gandhara, South Asia, but were not widely accepted in Europe until the 16th century.

The Han applied mathematics to various diverse disciplines. In musical tuning, Jing Fang (78–37 BC) realized that 53 perfect fifths was approximate to 31 octaves. He also created a musical scale of 60 tones, calculating the difference at ^{177147}/_{176776} (the same value of 53 equal temperament discovered by the German mathematician Nicholas Mercator [1620–1687], i.e. 3^{53}/2^{84}).

=== Astronomy ===
Mathematics were essential in drafting the astronomical calendar, a lunisolar calendar that used the Sun and Moon as time-markers throughout the year. In the 5th century BC, during the Spring and Autumn period, the Chinese established the Sifen calendar (古四分歷), which measured the tropical year at 365.25 days. This was replaced in 104 BC with the Taichu calendar (太初曆) that measured the tropical year at 365 385/1539 (~ 365.25016) days and the lunar month at 29 43/81 days. However, Emperor Zhang later reinstated the Sifen calendar.

Han dynasty astronomers made star catalogues and detailed records of comets that appeared in the night sky, including recording the appearance of the comet now known as Halley's Comet in 12 BC. They adopted a geocentric model of the universe, theorizing that it was a sphere surrounding the Earth in the centre. They assumed that the Sun, Moon, and planets were spherical and not disc-shaped. They also thought that the illumination of the Moon and planets was caused by sunlight, that lunar eclipses occurred when the Earth obstructed sunlight falling onto the Moon, and that a solar eclipse occurred when the Moon obstructed sunlight from reaching the Earth. Although others disagreed with his model, Wang Chong accurately described the water cycle of the evaporation of water into clouds.

=== Cartography, ships, and vehicles ===
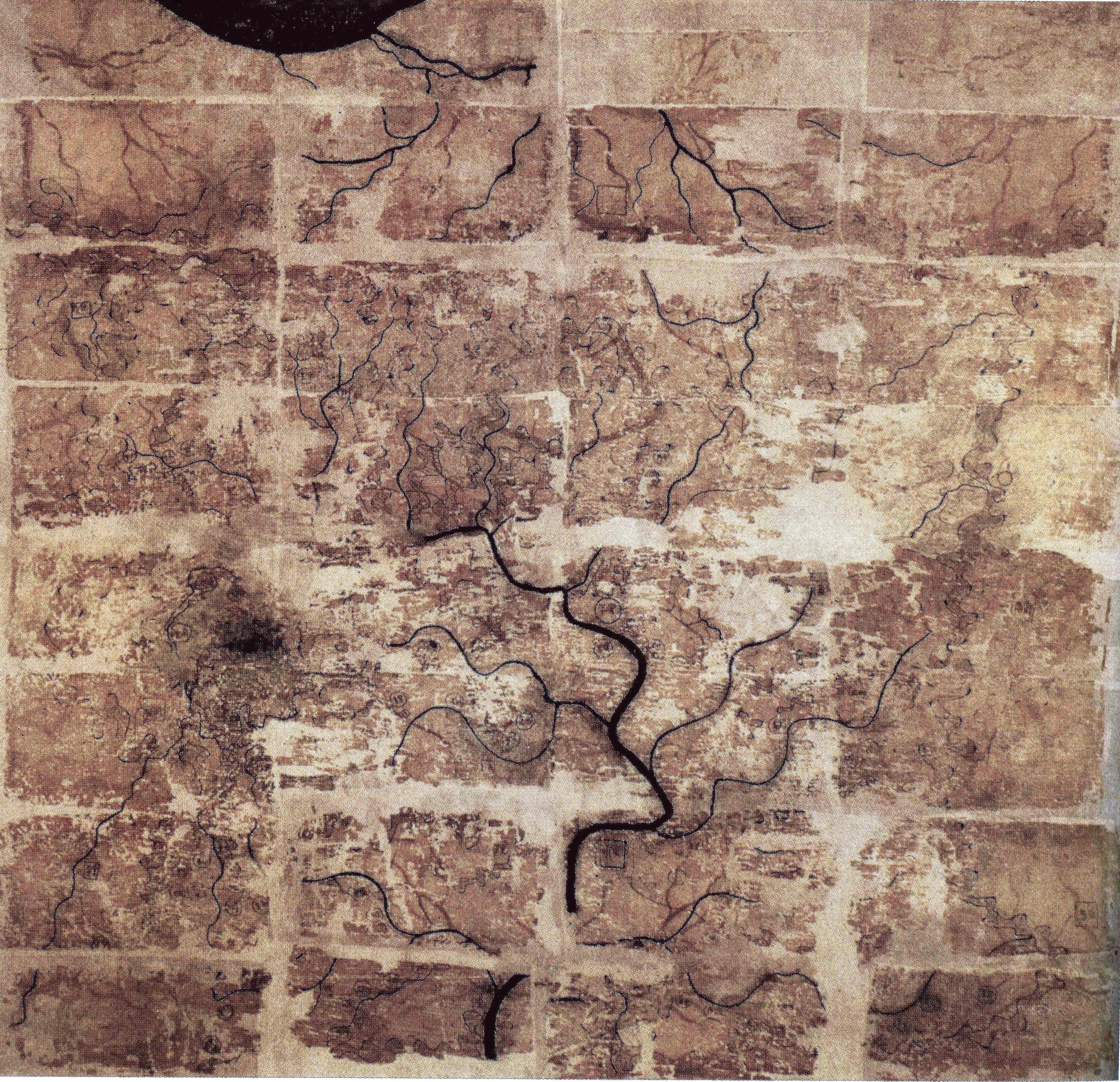
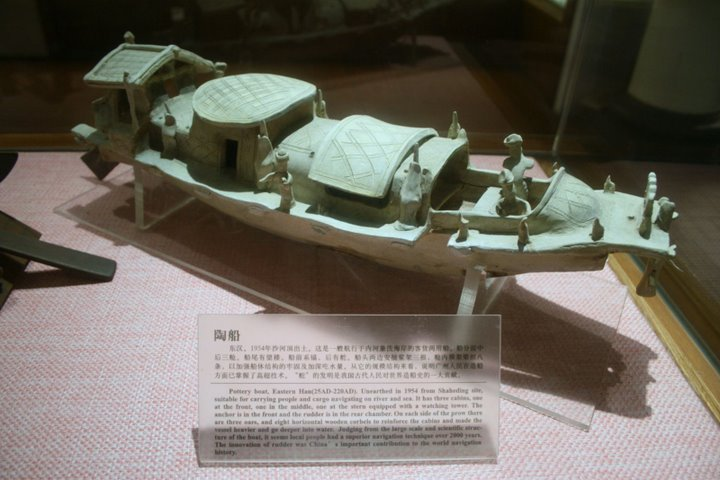
Left: A silk map from the early Western Han depicting the kingdoms of Changsha and Nanyue in southern China, with the southern direction oriented at the top – Mawangdui tomb No. 3
Right: An Eastern Han pottery boat model with a steering rudder at the stern and anchor at the bow

Both literary and archaeological evidence has demonstrated that cartography in China predated the Han. Some of the oldest Han-era maps that have been discovered were written using ink on silk, and were found amongst the Mawangdui Silk Texts in a 2nd-century BC tomb in Hunan. The general Ma Yuan created the world's first known raised-relief map from rice in the 1st century. This date could be revised if the tomb of Qin Shi Huang is excavated and the Shiji's account of a model map of the empire is proven to be true.

Although the use of graduated scales and grid references in maps was not thoroughly described prior to the work of Pei Xiu (AD 224–271), there is evidence that their use was introduced in the early 2nd century by the cartographer Zhang Heng.

The Han sailed in various types of ships that differed from those used in previous eras, such as the tower ship. The junk design was developed and realized during the Han era. Junk ships featured a square-ended bow and stern, a flat-bottomed hull or carvel-shaped hull with no keel or sternpost, and solid transverse bulkheads in the place of structural ribs found in Western vessels. Moreover, Han ships were the first in the world to be steered using a rudder at the stern, in contrast to the simpler steering oar used for riverine transport, allowing them to sail on the high seas.

Although ox carts and chariots were previously used in China, the wheelbarrow was first used in Han China in the 1st century BC. Han artwork of horse-drawn chariots shows that the Warring-States-Era heavy wooden yoke placed around a horse's chest was replaced by the softer breast strap. Later, during the Northern Wei (386–534), the fully developed horse collar was invented.

=== Medicine ===
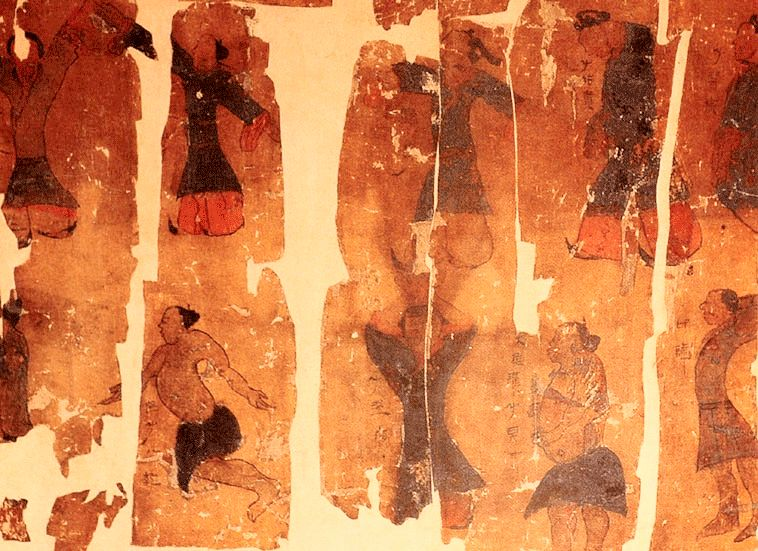
The physical exercise chart; a painting on silk depicting the practice of Daoyin – Mawangdui tomb No. 3

Han-era medical physicians believed that the human body was subject to the same forces of nature that governed the greater universe, namely the cosmological cycles of yin and yang and the five phases. Each organ of the body was associated with a particular phase. Illness was viewed as a sign that qi, or vital energy, channels leading to a certain organ had been disrupted. Thus, Han-era physicians prescribed medicine that was believed to counteract this imbalance.

For example, since the wood phase was believed to promote the fire phase, medicinal ingredients associated with the wood phase could be used to heal an organ associated with the fire phase. Besides dieting, Han physicians also prescribed moxibustion, acupuncture, and callisthenics as methods of maintaining one's health. When surgery was performed by the Chinese physician Hua Tuo (d. AD 208), he used anaesthesia to numb his patients' pain and prescribed a rubbing ointment that allegedly sped up the healing process for surgical wounds. The physician Zhang Zhongjing (c. 150 – c. 219 AD) is known to have written the Shanghan Lun ("Dissertation on Typhoid Fever"), and it is thought that he and Hua Tuo collaborated to compile the Shennong Bencaojing medical text.

== See also ==
- Battle of Jushi – Battle in Ming China
- Campaign against Dong Zhuo – Coalition of officials and warlords against Chinese warlord Dong Zhuo (190)
- Comparative studies of the Roman and Han empires
- Han Emperors family tree
- Shuanggudui – Archeological site located near Fuyang in China
- Ten Attendants – Influential eunuch-officials during the reign of Emperor Ling

== Notes ==
Preceded by Qin dynasty	Dynasties in Chinese history 206 BC – AD 220	Succeeded by Three Kingdoms
