= Rice mill =

Food-processing industry where paddy is processed

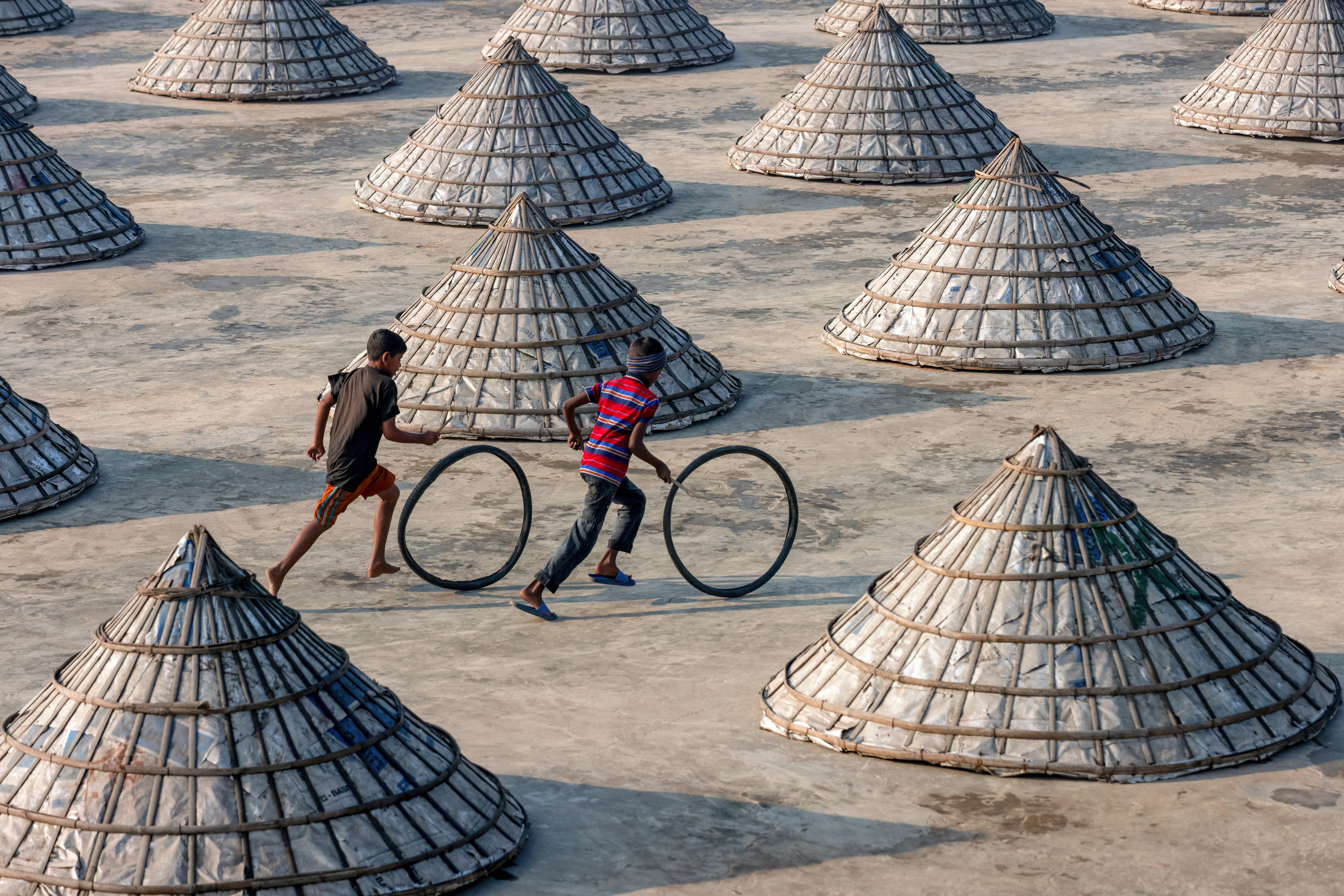
A group of children playing in a rice mill in Brahmanbaria, Bangladesh.

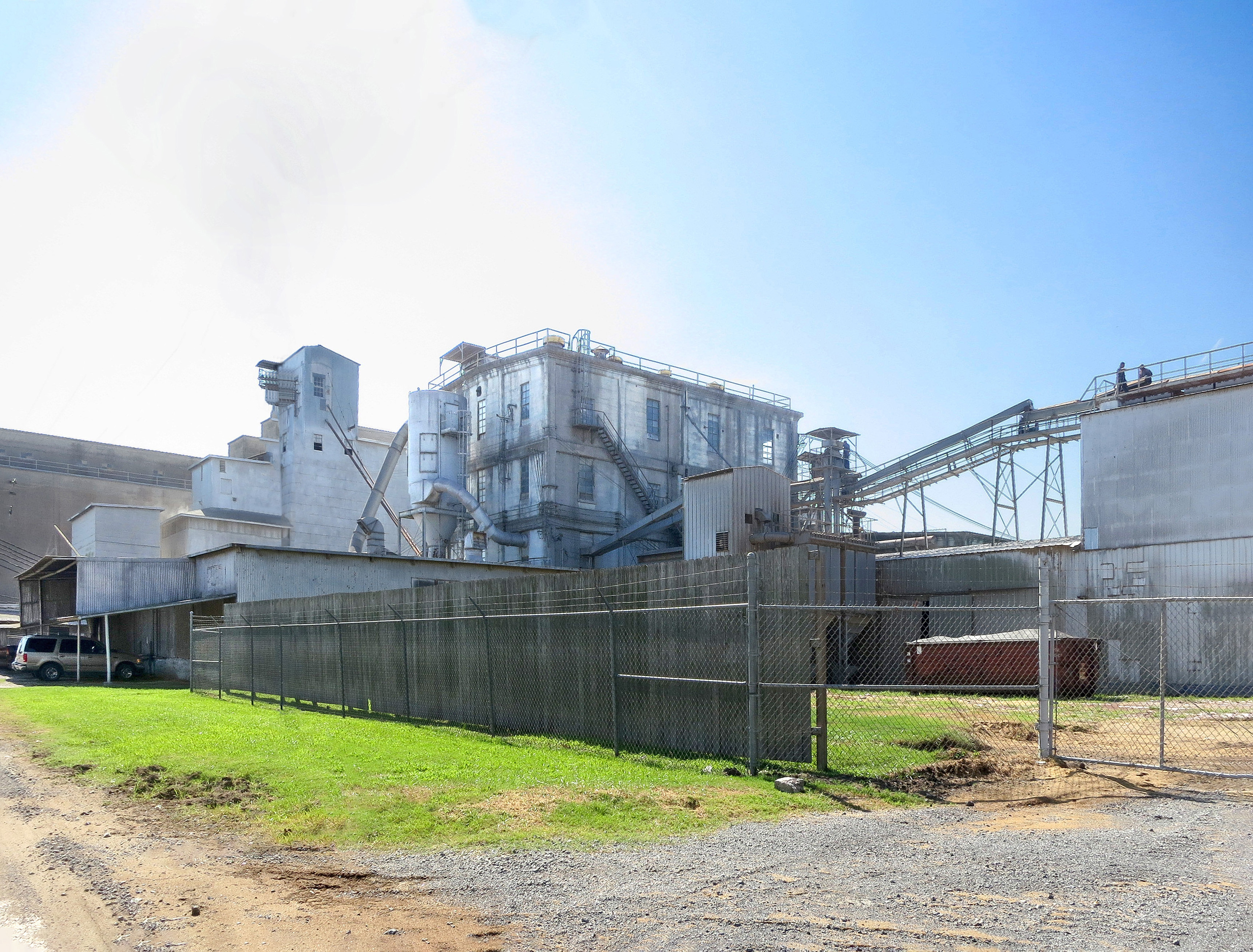
Rice mill in Beaumont, Texas

A rice mill is a food-processing facility where paddy (unmilled rice) is processed by cleaning the grain, removing the hull, sorting, and packing the rice, leaving it in its final form for sale to consumers.

== Process ==
The entire product is procured from paddy fields, milled and processed hygienically in modern machinery and dust-free environment and cleaned through sorting machines.

=== Paddy procurement ===
Paddy is harvested from the fields to be processed. The paddy is again rechecked before the process begins. The procured paddy is checked bag by bag by a team and stored in Paddy Milling Plants.

=== Cleaning and boiling ===
To start with the production process, paddy is cleaned by a paddy pre-cleaning machine and the cleaned paddy is stored in raw paddy storage bins. The stored paddy is moved to food-grade stainless steel soaking tanks. Water is drained from the tank and the wet paddy is ready for boiling.

Boiling is done by a steam boiler. The boiled paddy is then moved to the paddy dryer through a belt conveyor.

=== Dryer ===
The boiled wet paddy is dried in a food-grade stainless steel paddy drier using hot air. The heat energy for the drier is generated using a heat exchanger that uses steam from the boiler. Using a steam heat exchanger will sustain the real aroma of the paddy. These are indirect heat exchangers so there is no chance of smoke air entering the drier. The dried paddy is ready for hulling.

=== Hulling ===
The dried paddy is cleaned again and destoned by a pre-cleaning machine.

After this second cleaning step, the paddy is moved to a rice huller, also known as a dehusker or sheller. The outer covering of the paddy, the husk is removed here and is used as a fuel for the boiler. If the finished product will be sold as brown rice, the product is moved directly to the sorting and packing steps from here.

For white rice, the whole rice is collected from the sheller and moved on to the whitener. Here, the film coat on the rice, which is called bran is removed from the rice and the bran is collected separately. The whitening process is done by a whitener.

The whitened rice is polished by a silky rice polisher. The polished rice is destoned again by a destoner and the broken rice is separated by a length grader.

=== Color sorting ===
The polished full-grain rice is sorted in a colour sorter which removes black rice, yellow rice, and white belly. Then, the rice is moved to the packing section.

=== Packing ===
The processed rice is then packed in woven sacks and is ready to be sold in the market.

== See also ==
- Rice huller
- Rice polisher
