= Sundries =

Sundries (singular sundry) may refer to:

- Miscellaneous small items, usually of no large value and too numerous to mention separately, such as toiletries
- Sundry (cricket)
- Sari-sari store
