= Rice bran solubles =

Nutritional product

Rice bran solubles are a nutritional product derived from the bran shavings produced as brown rice is converted into white rice. The shavings are usually discarded or used for animal feed. In Japan, they are used in some traditional pickling recipes. To produce rice bran solubles, the bran shavings are heat treated to prolong shelf-life and then enzymatically extracted to collect water-soluble components.

Rice bran solubles are used as a nutritional supplement. The supplement is sometimes called tocos because of its high content of tocopherols (vitamin E). Rice bran solubles contains about 15–40% fat, 0–25% dietary fiber, 0–15% protein, and 25–80% carbohydrates.

Concerns have been raised about the levels of arsenic in rice bran solubles. Rice naturally accumulates arsenic from the soil as it grows, with rice bran having higher levels than white rice. One study found that rice bran solubles contain even higher concentrations of arsenic. Consumption of products at the manufacturers recommended rate would provide 0.012–0.038 mg of arsenic, above the maximum level of 0.01 mg level considered safe.
