= White rice =

Milled rice that has had its husk, bran, and germ removed

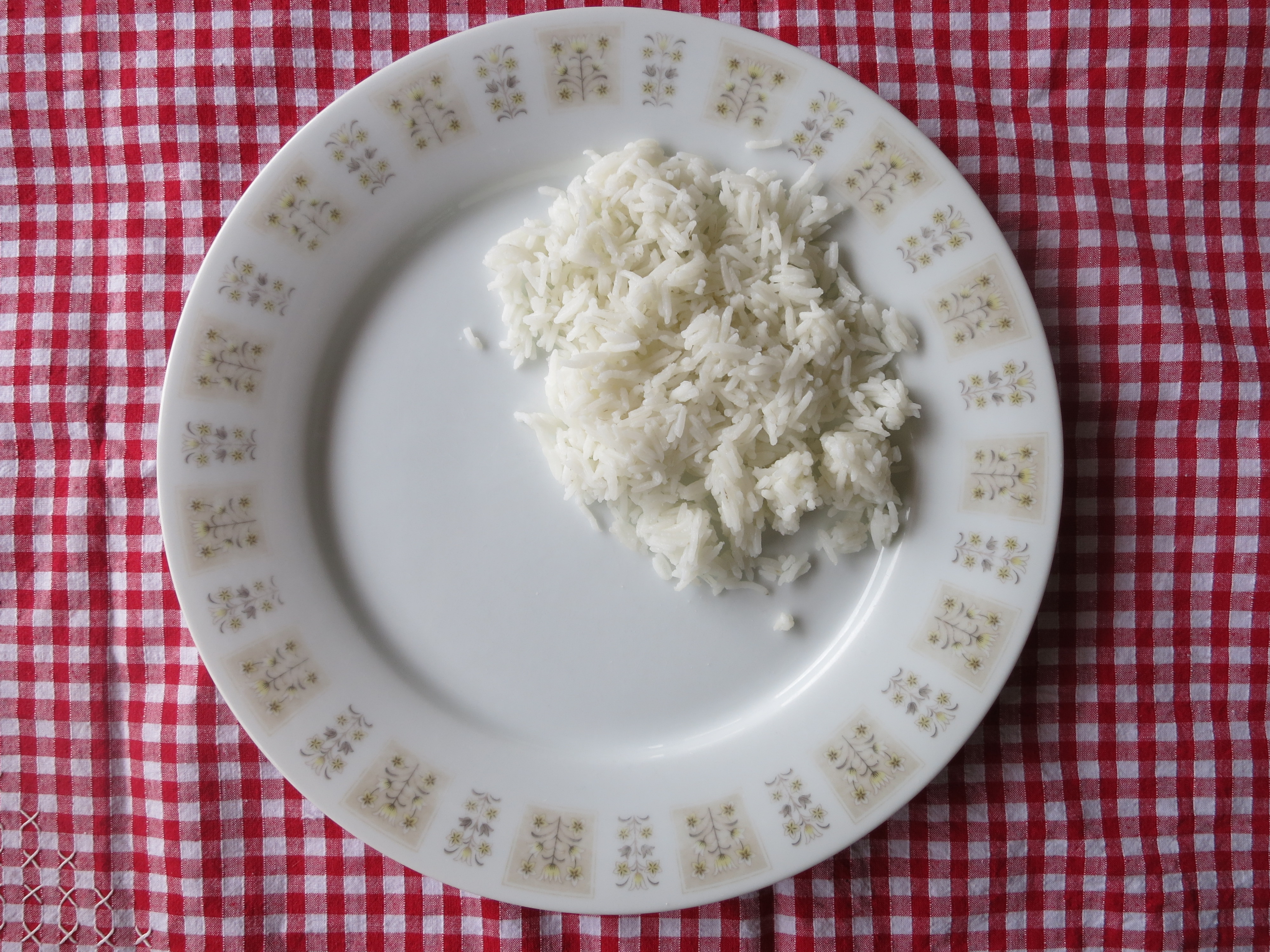
White rice, cooked

In food processing, white rice is processed rice that has been through a rice milling process, where bran, husk, and germ are removed from whole-grains of brown rice. Milling gives rice grains a softer texture, milder flavor, and its characteristic white appearance. This removal of the bran layers also significantly reduces its nutritional value as it removes essential nutrients such as fiber, vitamins, and minerals. The development and spread of white rice over time resulted from historical changes in rice cultivation, trade, and advances in milling technology.

== Milling rice ==
Early milling methods were labor-intensive and involved hand-pounding techniques, with large mortar and pestle type devices resulting in low production and high labor costs. With the introduction of mechanical milling in the late 19th century, larger quantities were produced, and after 1870, production was mostly done industrially. Machines such as the Huller & Sheller mills (1870) and the Engelberg Milling Machine (1890) further enabled the large scale production of polished white rice. Some versions of this improved uniformity of the product, but with mechanical milling, much larger quantities were produced.

By 1955, new machinery had been developed in Japan that had significantly improved the quality and output capacity. Following these advancements, rice milling continued to develop in order to reduce labor demands while also increasing efficiency and production. In the decades after 1955, improvements in milling technology allowed for the processing of larger quantities of rice with greater speed. These developments were part of the trend of industrialization in the rice industry. Technological advancements and innovations completely changed the practices of production and further expanded rice availability in the global market.

== Nutritional content ==
Rice, white, long-grain, regular, unenriched, cooked without salt
Nutritional value per 100 g (3.5 oz)
- Energy: 130 kcal (540 kJ)
- Carbohydrates: 28.2 g
- Sugars: 0.05 g
- Dietary fiber: 0.4 g
- Fat: 0.28 g
- Protein: 2.69 g
Vitamins and minerals
Vitamins	Quantity %DV^{†}
Thiamine (B1)	2% 0.02 mg
Riboflavin (B2)	1% 0.013 mg
Niacin (B3)	3% 0.4 mg
Pantothenic acid (B5)	8% 0.39 mg
Vitamin B6	5% 0.093 mg
Folate (B9)	1% 3 μg
Minerals	Quantity %DV^{†}
Calcium	1% 10 mg
Iron	1% 0.2 mg
Magnesium	3% 12 mg
Manganese	21% 0.472 mg
Phosphorus	3% 43 mg
Potassium	1% 35 mg
Selenium	14% 7.5 μg
Sodium	0% 1 mg
Zinc	4% 0.49 mg
- Other constituents: Quantity
- Water: 68.4 g
- Link to USDA FoodData Central entry
- ^{†}Percentages estimated using US recommendations for adults, except for potassium, which is estimated based on expert recommendation from the National Academies.

Cooked white rice is 68% water, 28% carbohydrates, 3% protein, and 0.3% fat (table). In a reference amount of 100 g (3.5 oz), cooked white rice supplies 130 calories of food energy, and is a rich source (20% or more of the Daily Value, DV) of manganese, and a moderate source of selenium, with no other micronutrients in significant content (table).

== Fortification ==
White rice may be fortified with micronutrients stripped from it during processing. Enrichment of white rice with thiamine, niacin, and iron is required by law in the United States when distributed by government programs to schools, nonprofits, or foreign countries.

Consuming only unenriched white rice may cause beriberi due to a deficiency of thiamine, which caused a major health issue in Japan by the 18th century.

Adopted over brown rice in the second half of the 19th century, white rice was favored by traders because of the removal of the bran and germ which improved its storage life during long distance transports. The expansion of long distance trade contributed to the widespread consumption of white rice in Asia and other regions, as rice spread from East Asia to West Asia and Europe by land and sea via trade routes that later became associated with the Silk Road. Ease of cooking, palatability, and longer shelf life are all reasons white rice became more widely used than brown rice. Historically, in some societies, eating white rice was a symbol of high status due to its scarcity, and it was widely preferred to brown rice in many regions. At various times, starting in the 19th century, brown rice and other grains such as wild rice have been advocated as healthier alternatives. The bran in brown rice contains significant dietary fiber and the germ contains micronutrients. This discovery led to the advocacy for the consumption of unpolished grain and greatly influenced health and dietary policies in many different countries.

== See also ==
- Parboiled rice
- Rice husks
- Rice mill
- Rice huller
- Rice polisher
- Whole grain
- Red rice
- Maratelli
