= Tingi culture =

Purchasing goods in small quantities

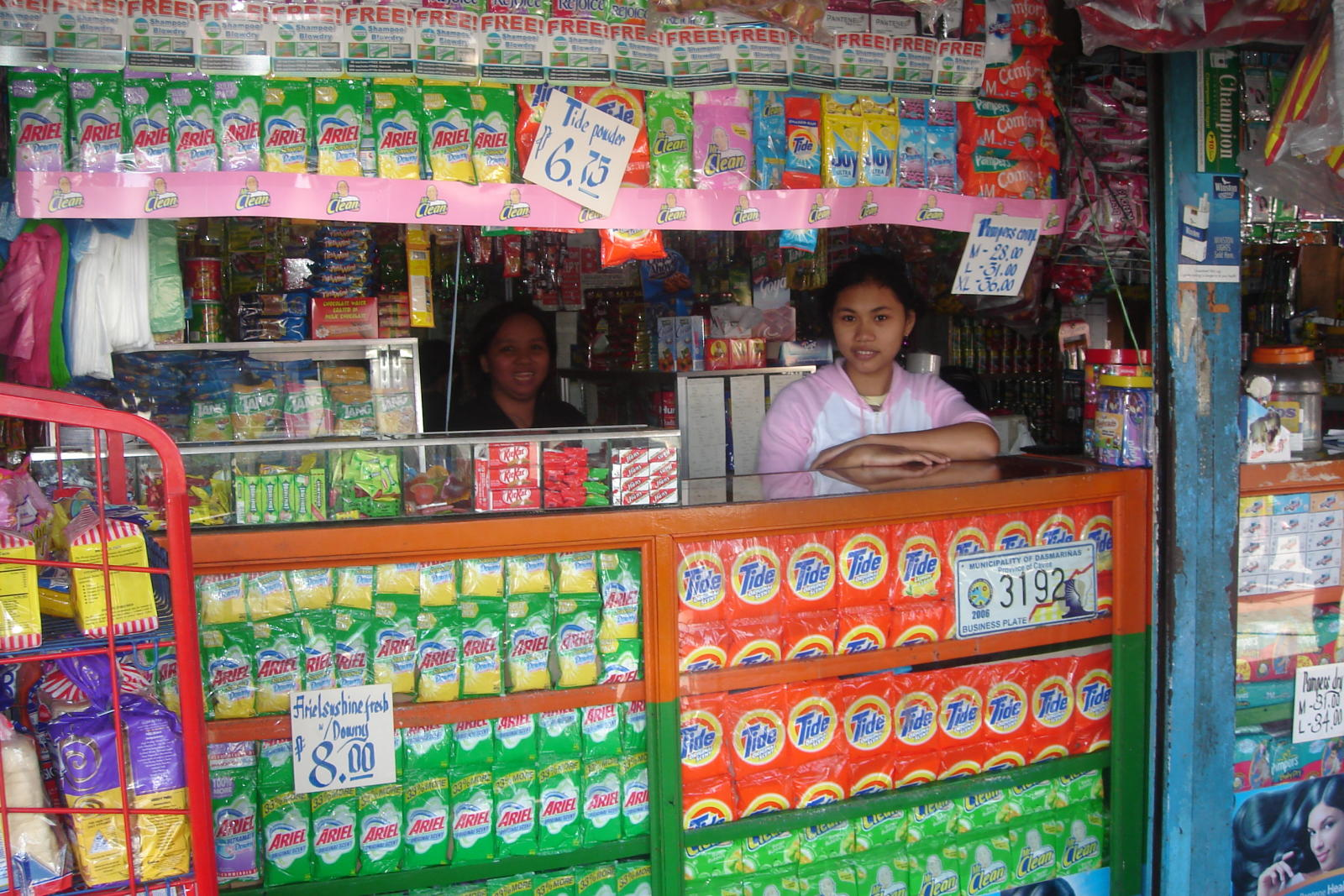
Sari-sari stores typically sell products in sachets.

The Philippines is characterized by a prevalent tingi culture, a consumer behavior where individuals purchase and trade goods in small quantities, often in single servings. This practice is commonly observed in neighborhood sari-sari stores, but has also become a trend in the corporate retail sector.

== Origins and implications ==
The tingi culture is deeply rooted in the country's socioeconomic landscape, particularly in the widespread poverty and financial constraints faced by many Filipinos. Unable to afford bulk purchases, individuals opt for smaller, more manageable quantities, prioritizing short-term needs over long-term savings.

== Environmental consequences ==
The proliferation of single-serving packaging has led to a significant environmental issue: plastic pollution. Products marketed in sachets, plastic bags, and other non-biodegradable materials contribute to staggering statistics:

- Average annual consumption: 591 sachets, 174 shopping bags, and 163 plastic labo bags per person.
- Daily usage: approximately 57 million shopping bags nationwide, totaling 20.6 billion pieces annually.

=== Current status and challenges ===
Despite efforts to address plastic pollution, the tingi culture persists, especially in rural provinces. While some cities have implemented plastic bans, comprehensive solutions remain elusive. Ongoing initiatives aim to balance economic realities with sustainable practices, mitigating the environmental impact of this deeply ingrained consumer culture.
