= Engelberg Huller Company =

American machinery manufacturer

- Company type: Manufacturing of hulling and milling machines
- Industry: Hulling and milling machine manufacture, later metalworking machinery
- Genre: Machines for hulling and cleaning coffee, rice and other grain
- Founded: 1888
- Founder: John Montague
- Fate: In 1971 was renamed, Sundstrand-Engelberg, Inc. of Liverpool, New York. In 1974, the name changed to Sundstrand Syracuse, Inc. of Syracuse, New York, and Sundstrand Corp. of Rockford, Illinois.
- Headquarters: Syracuse, New York, United States
- Area served: United States, Europe, Africa, Asia, South America, North America, Central America
- Key people: Evaristo Conrado Engelberg (1853–1932), Willard Halstead
- Products: Hullers and milling machines; later metalworking tools such as; grinders, belt and disc sanders
- Number of employees: 35 in 1910

The Engelberg Huller Company was established in 1888 in Syracuse, New York, by John R. Montague, to manufacture and distribute the Engelberg Huller machine which was invented by Brazilian mechanical engineer and inventor, Evaristo Conrado Engelberg, and Willard Halstead to remove the husks and shells from rice and coffee during the milling process.

The Engelberg Huller Company was sold to an agricultural equipment manufacturer located in Nicholson, Pennsylvania, in 1976. The CEO and owner in 1976 was James Solon. Engelberg Huller Co., INC is still operating a manufacturing plant in Nicholson, PA, exporting Engelberg spare parts and equipment.
