= Bran =

Hard outer layers of cereal grain

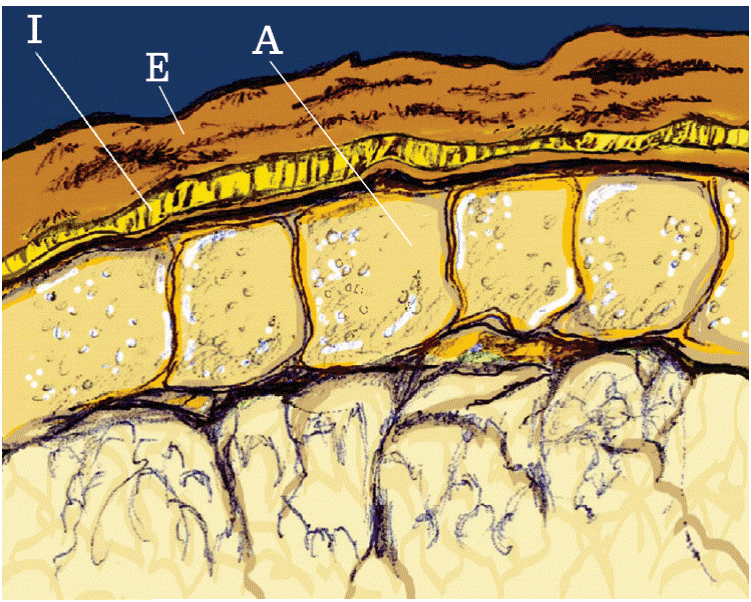
Wheat bran structure (E: outer layer; I: intermediate layer; A: aleurone layer)

Bran, also known as miller's bran, is the component of a cereal grain consisting of the outer hard layers – the combined aleurone and pericarp – surrounding the endosperm. Corn (maize) bran also includes the pedicel (tip cap). Along with the germ, it is an integral part of whole grains, and is often produced as a byproduct of milling in the production of refined grains. Bran is very nutritious, but is difficult to digest due to its high fiber content; its high fat content also reduces its shelf life as the oils/fats are prone to becoming rancid. As such, it is typically removed from whole grain during the refining process – e.g. in processing wheat grain into white flour, or refining brown rice into white rice.

Bran is present in cereal grain, including rice, corn (maize), wheat, oats, barley, rye, and millet. Bran is not the same as chaff, which is a coarser, scaly material surrounding the grain and is indigestible by humans.

== Composition ==
Bran is particularly rich in dietary fiber and essential fatty acids, and contains significant quantities of starch, protein, vitamins, and dietary minerals. It is also a source of phytic acid, an antinutrient that prevents nutrient absorption.

The high oil content of bran makes it subject to rancidification, one of the reasons that it is often separated from the grain before storage or further processing. Bran is often heat-treated to increase its shelf life.

Nutrients (%)	Wheat	Rye	Oat	Rice	Barley
Carbohydrates (excluding starch)	45–50	50–70	16–34	18–23	70–80
Starch	13–18	12–15	18–45	18–30	8–11
Proteins	15–18	8–9	13–20	15–18	11–15
Fats	4–5	4–5	6–11	18–23	1–2

== Rice bran ==
Rice bran is a byproduct of the rice-milling process (the conversion of brown rice to white rice), and it contains various antioxidants. A major rice bran fraction contains 12%–13% oil and highly unsaponifiable components (4.3%). This fraction contains tocotrienols (a form of vitamin E), gamma-oryzanol, and beta-sitosterol; all these constituents may contribute to the lowering of the plasma levels of the various parameters of the lipid profile. Rice bran also contains a high level of dietary fiber (beta-glucan, pectin, and gum). It also contains ferulic acid, which is also a component of the structure of nonlignified cell walls. Some research suggests, however, that inorganic arsenic is present at some level in rice bran. One study found the levels to be 20% higher than in contaminated drinking water.

== Uses ==
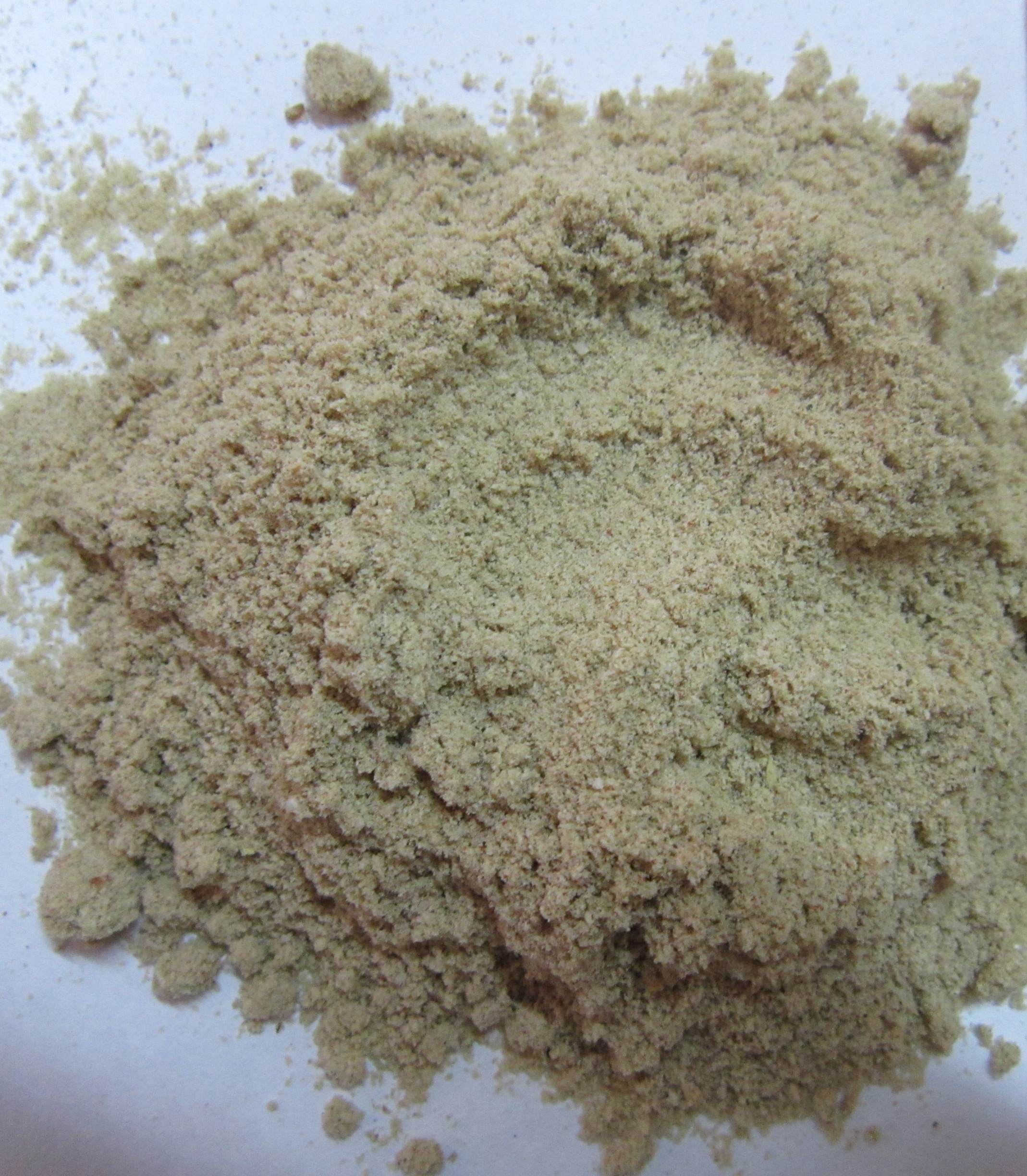
Rice bran

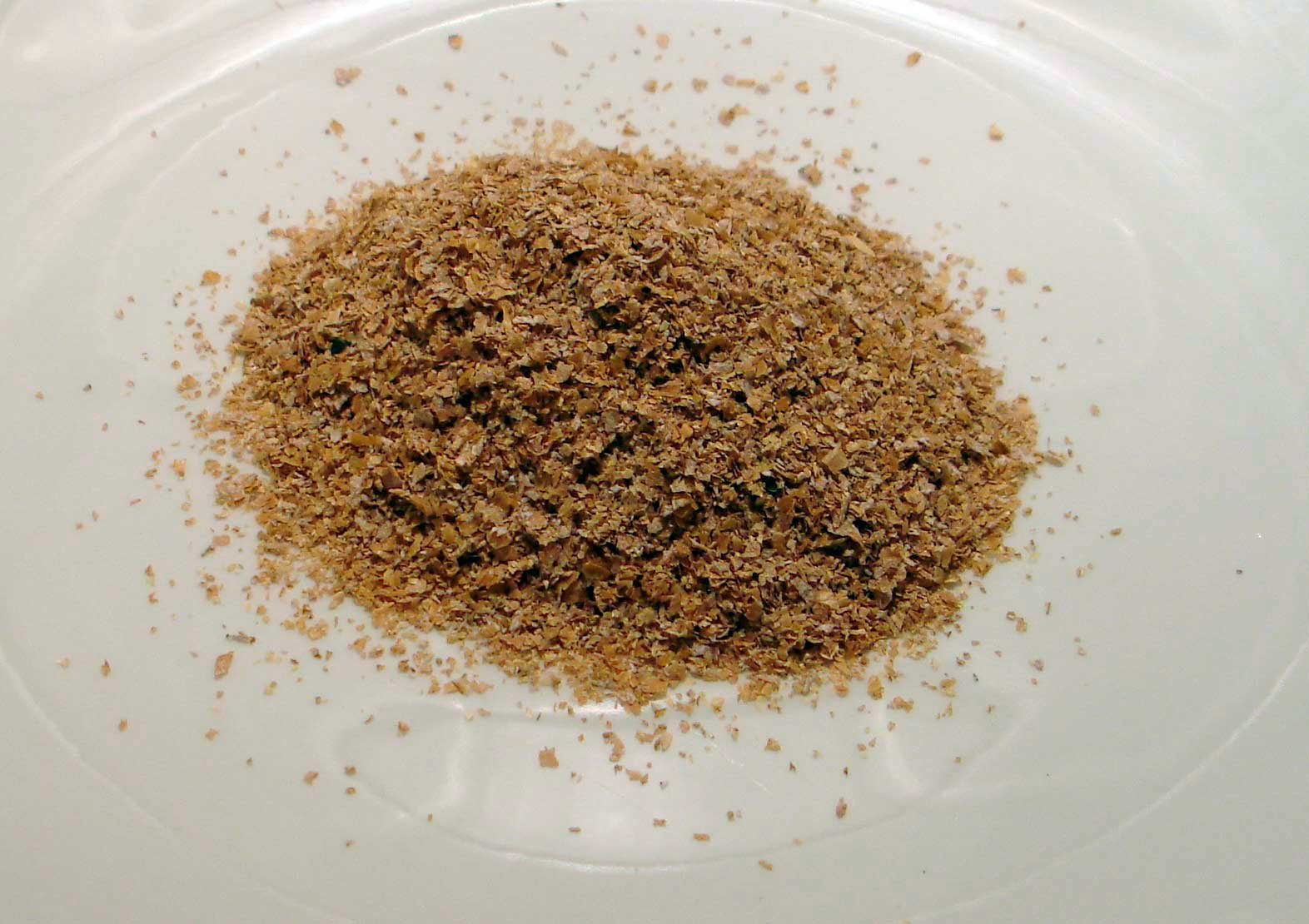
Wheat bran

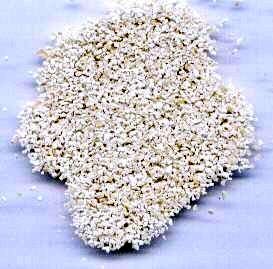
Oat bran

Bran is often used to enrich breads (notably muffins) and breakfast cereals, especially for the benefit of those wishing to increase their intake of dietary fiber. Bran may also be used for pickling (nukazuke) as in the tsukemono of Japan, as well as in the production of East Asian black vinegars.

Rice bran in particular finds many uses in Japan, where it is known as nuka (糠; ぬか). Besides using it for pickling, Japanese people add it to the water when boiling bamboo shoots, and use it for dish washing. In Kitakyushu City, it is called jinda and used for stewing fish, such as sardines.

Wheat bran is useful as feed for poultry and other livestock, as part of a balanced ration with other inputs. Wheatings, a milling byproduct comprising mostly bran with some pieces of endosperm also left over, are included in this category.

Bran oil may be also extracted for use by itself for industrial purposes (such as in the paint industry), or as a cooking oil, such as rice bran oil.

Bran was found to be the most successful slug deterrent by BBC's TV programme Gardeners' World. It is a common substrate and food source used for feeder insects, such as mealworms and waxworms. Wheat bran has also been used for tanning leather since at least the 16th century.

== Research ==
Recent reviews have summarized research into the nutritional and other health benefits of bran.

== Stability ==
Commonly, bran is heat-treated with the intention of slowing undesirable rancidification, but a 2003 study of heat-treatment of oat bran found a complex pattern whereby increasingly intense heat treatment reduced the development of hydrolytic rancidity and bitterness with time, but increased oxidative rancidity. The authors recommended that heat treatment should be sufficient to achieve selective lipase inactivation, but not so much as to render the polar lipids oxidizable upon prolonged storage.

== See also ==
- Alkylresorcinols
- Cereal germ
- Phytic acid (IP6)
- Rice bran solubles
- Raisin bran
