= Qingyang sachet =

Qingyang Chinese sachet custom

Qingyang sachet, also known as "chu chu" or "shua huo" (hidden stitch) is a folk custom of Qingyang, Gansu, China. Sachets are created from small pieces of silk, which are embroidered with colorful thread in a variety of patterns according to papercutting designs. The silk is then sewn into different shapes and filled with cotton and spices. Qingyang sachets symbolize blessing, auspiciousness, happiness, safety, peace, and avoidance of evil, disaster, illnesses, and misfortune. Many sachets are also filled with cinnabar, calamus, wormwood, and chrysanthemum, and they are commonly used as air fresheners, insect repellent, and protection against evil spirits.

== History ==
Historically sachet has also gone by the names of purse, "xiangnang," "peiwei," and "rongchou". In Qingyang, however, it is commonly known as "chu chu" or "shua huo" "Chu" originally referred to the original method of using bone needles for sewing, but later referred to the sachet itself, which is made of cloth. In local Qingyang culture, it may also be called purse or “shua huo zi.”

Historians differ on the exact origins of the sachet. One account dates it around 2300 BC. Another accredits the sachet to the mythological doctor Qibo and to a passage in the Huangdi Neijing, which has been dated between the late Warring States period (475–221 BCE) and the Han dynasty (206 BCE-220 CE). More rooted in tangible history, the sachet appeared in the Warring States period as distinctive decorations worn as a clothing accessory as well as mosquito repellent. The origins of the “fragrant sachet” has been assigned to rural Chinese women during the Han dynasty. During this time, an account appeared in the Book of Rites, compiled by Dai Sheng, which described the popularity of perfumed and embroidered brocade sachets, especially among young people who wore these sachets around their wrists, necks, and waists. They were also popular in the Tang (618–906) and Song (960–1279) dynasties, but were mainly luxuries for the wealthy and powerful. Qingyang’s male officials and women from elite families wore sachets filled with traditional Chinese medicine rather than perfume. Sachets would later be used as tokens of love and affection in the Qing dynasty (1644–1661).

The oldest existing sachet is approximately 800 years old. In 2001 people excavated stone pagodas from the Song dynasty in Qingyang. They found a sachet embroidered with plums and lotus flowers, its pattern still clear despite the passage of time. Thus the sachet earned the name “Longevity Sachet.”

In 2002, China Folklore Society named Qingyang City "the Hometown of Embroidery Sachets." In 2006, China's State Council included Qingyang sachets in the first official batch of "National Intangible Cultural Heritage," promoting the sachets as the cultural brand of foreign exchange of Qingyang City.

Today the sachet is seen most commonly at the Dragon Boat Festival, in which the making and wearing of "chu chu" is a local custom. Festival goers and locals use sachets filled with herbal medicine to pray for their health while many children wear them in hopes of increasing their intelligence, peace, and health. Many popular mainstream sachets are created by Qingyang Lingyun Clothing Co., Ltd., with Zhang Zhifeng as chairperson, who is an inheritor of sachet-making. The company employs 200 people and creates 40 million yuan worth of clothing and sachets annually. The company purchases sachets from rural women, processes them, and then resells the sachets to the public.

== Types ==
There are four main ways to construct a sachet, involving unique needlework, attaching accessories, and the sachet's overall shape:

1. Chu chu: This sachet entails hiding the stitches while embroidering, thus creating a sachet without visible stitching.
2. Spool: This sachet is made with many colors and is designed in the shape of Zongzi (a pyramid-shaped mass of glutinous rice wrapped in leaves).
3. 3D: These sachets can be complicated, with accessories dangling from one or all sides of the sachet. There are up to 400 formats of the 3D sachet.
4. Plain embroidery: This sachet is simple, focusing mainly on the embroidery itself than the sachet's construction.

== Common symbols and patterns ==
Qingyang sachets often exhibit repeated symbols and patterns, reflecting Qingyang's past and present traditions, beliefs, and religion. Sachets are typically embroidered with flora and fauna. Since ancient times, Qingyang’s dominant philosophical strongholds have been Confucianism and Taoism, and their various tenants appear symbolically and thematically in the designs of sachets. Important Confucianist ideals are filial piety, strength-borrowing (achieving one’s objectives through the strength of others), the Five Bonds (ruler to ruled, father to son, husband to wife, elder brother to younger brother, and friend to friend), and the doctrine of the “mean” and “neutralization” (being impartial and in harmonious portion while dealing with the everyday). Taoism, on the other hand, places emphasis on quietism, effortless action, and immortality. The main philosophy that emerges from these two traditions is that man is an integral part of nature and should therefore follow natural laws, which dominates the symbolism adorning Qingyang sachets. In addition, many symbols retain Buddhist ideals also circulated in the region, such as the golden fish and swastika.

Sachets typically consist of one of four patterns: shape-oriented, meaning-oriented, homophone-oriented, and heterogeneous patterns. Shared-oriented patterns include patterns that have shared-shapes (shapes intertwined or side-by-side), shape(s)-inside-shape(s) (an image within an image), and combined-shapes (two images melded together, typically an animal and a human). Shape-oriented patterns use easily recognizable images from local traditions to convey a story or idea. Meaning-oriented patterns convey a specific meaning and thus a specific purpose, such as praying for one's sons. Homophone-oriented patterns display various images, which represent words that share similar pronunciations as homophones. This allows for word play. Heterogeneous patterns consist of varying images and symbols versus a limited set of only few, as seen in the other three patterns.

Researchers and sachet artisans have compiled a various symbols and patterns common to Qingyang sachets, many of which are cataloged below.

- Bagua: This image derives from Taoist cosmology, consisting of combinations of three whole or broken lines.
- "Boy-fish": This pattern is one of combined-shapes, featuring the head of boy melded with the body of fish. The use of animals to express human desires and aspirations most likely derives from totem worship in ancient China. The boy-fish represents the ancient Chinese worship of the abilities of fish, including prolificacy and swimming. Improving oneself with the abilities of other animals is in line with the Confucian ideal of "being good at making use of materials," and the combination of fish and human represents the Confucian value of "harmony between man and nature."
- Cranes under pine trees: This pattern symbolizes longevity, a Taoist ideal.
- Dragon and phoenix: This auspicious pattern depicts both dragons and phoenixes, representing prosperity and good luck.
- Fish: The totem of the Pre Zhou dynasty, originating from North Bin. A single fish can also represent a penis while double fish may represent vulvae, thus also signifying the worship of Nüwa, the Chinese goddess of creation. Fish may also represent maternity and ancient fertility worship.
- "Fish-lotus-boy": A typical image used to express love, the fish-lotus-boy depicts procreation with a fish swimming through a lotus flower. The fish represents the male while the lotus represents the female, with a depiction of a boy who has been created through this process. This image indirectly expresses the desire for male offspring as well as "filial piety."
- Frog: The frog signifies continuing matrilineal worship and the worship of Nüwa. Because the Chinese symbol for frog has similar pronunciation as the Chinese symbol for baby, frogs also appear in sachets that are blessings for a newborn.
- Golden fish: This image originates in Buddhist culture, typically appearing as a pair of golden fishes. It is one of the eight auspicious symbols or Ashtamangala. It represents happiness, impulsiveness, fertility, profusion, freedom, conjugal harmony, and loyalty. Buddhist culture.
- Heart, gold ingot, and butterfly: These images typically appear on brightly-colored sachets, which result from and symbolize a woman's wisdom.
- "Immortals-turtles-peach": This pattern is typical of sachets used to pray for longevity. The traditional Chinese character for longevity (壽) is placed in the center with two turtles each carrying four immortals placed symmetrically around the character. Atop the character is a peach. The image of the Eight Immortals invokes ancient Chinese idol worship and prayer for immortal life. Both turtles and peaches are metaphors for longevity in Taoist fairytales. These images represent the Taoist ideal of "Nourishing of life."
- "Lotus-boy": A combination of a lotus and a virgin boy, this image is typical of those conveying praying for sons. It represents the desire for offspring, per the Confucian saying of “having no male heir is the gravest of the three cardinal offenses against filial piety.” Lotuses also have many seeds (籽 in Chinese). The character 籽 (seed) is pronounced "zi," the same as "son" (子). Because males inherit property in a patriarchal clan system, praying for one's sons over one's daughters embodies the patriarchal local folk cultural ideals of “valuing the male child only” and “carrying on the family line.” In addition, "lotus" (莲), pronounced as "lian,"has a similar pronunciation as "one after the other" (连), meaning praying for honorable sons one after the other.
- Lotus flower: This Buddhist image represents the universe. A white lotus signifies purity while a yellow lotus denotes spiritual ascension. A lotus may also represent vulvae.
- Mandarin ducks playing on water: This pattern symbolizes a devoted couple living in peace and harmony.
- "Rooster-fish-maize": This pattern includes two roosters, two fish, and two pieces of maize cobs, a type homophone-oriented pattern. "Rooster" (鸡) is pronounced as "ji" similar to 吉 (auspicious omen). "Fish" (鱼) and "maize" (玉米) are both pronounced "yu," similar to 余 (affluence). These homophones refer to the desire for auspicious and a prosperous life, including a good harvest with a grain surplus and a higher social status, in line with the Confucian ideal of "engaged in social life."
- "Six-happy-babies": This is a typical shared-shaped pattern, formed by two baby girls and a baby boy joined by their arms, legs, and torsos. This represents the wish for more offspring and is consistent with the Confucian ideal of harmony.
- Snake: An image representing continuing matrilineal worship and the worship of Nüwa.
- Swastika: An image from Buddhism, used to represent auspiciousness.
- Taijitu: An image from Chinese philosophy, used to represent auspiciousness.
- Tiger: A totem of “the Western toad family”, the original inhabitants of Qingyang district. Tigers also signify subduing and warding off evil spirits, accounting for their popularity.
- "Tweeted-totter-snakes": This shape-inside-shape pattern depicts a tortoise in the middle of two snakes. This image signifies the Confucian doctrine of "Mean" and neutralization as well as the theme of "seeking longevity" in Chinese culture. The snakes and tortoise also represent Confucian "harmony" and the "power of team" while the distinction between the primary (the tortoise, the center of the pattern) and the secondary (the snakes) represents Confucian "hierarchy."
