= Γ-Oryzanol =

γ-Oryzanol
Names
- Other names gamma-Oryzanol; gamma-Orizanol

Identifiers
CAS Number	11042-64-1; Oryzanol A: 21238-33-5; Oryzanol C: 469-36-3; Campesteryl ferulate: 20972-07-0
3D model (JSmol)	Oryzanol A: Interactive image; Oryzanol C: Interactive image; Campesteryl ferulate: Interactive image
ChemSpider	Oryzanol A: 4445360; Oryzanol C: 8095807; Campesteryl ferulate: 34987811
ECHA InfoCard	100.110.371
PubChem CID	Oryzanol A: 12313778; Oryzanol C: 12313783; Campesteryl ferulate: 15056832
UNII	SST9XCL51M; Oryzanol A: 3PQR2YON9T; Oryzanol C: HF5P8298M3; Campesteryl ferulate: 8BZA1H952Q
CompTox Dashboard (EPA)	DTXSID6021084
- InChI: Oryzanol A: InChI=1S/C40H58O4/c1-26(2)10-9-11-27(3)29-18-20-38(7)33-16-15-32-36(4,5)34(19-21-39(32)25-40(33,39)23-22-37(29,38)6)44-35(42)17-13-28-12-14-30(41)31(24-28)43-8/h10,12-14,17,24,27,29,32-34,41H,9,11,15-16,18-23,25H2,1-8H3/b17-13+ Key: FODTZLFLDFKIQH-GHRIWEEISA-N; Oryzanol C: InChI=1S/C41H60O4/c1-26(2)27(3)10-11-28(4)30-18-20-39(8)34-16-15-33-37(5,6)35(19-21-40(33)25-41(34,40)23-22-38(30,39)7)45-36(43)17-13-29-12-14-31(42)32(24-29)44-9/h12-14,17,24,26,28,30,33-35,42H,3,10-11,15-16,18-23,25H2,1-2,4-9H3/b17-13+ Key: JBSUVXVGZSMGDJ-GHRIWEEISA-N; Campesteryl ferulate: InChI=1S/C38H56O4/c1-24(2)25(3)8-9-26(4)31-14-15-32-30-13-12-28-23-29(18-20-37(28,5)33(30)19-21-38(31,32)6)42-36(40)17-11-27-10-16-34(39)35(22-27)41-7/h10-12,16-17,22,24-26,29-33,39H,8-9,13-15,18-21,23H2,1-7H3/b17-11+/t25-,26-,29+,30+,31-,32+,33+,37+,38-/m1/s1 Key: SWIWTAJTJOYCTB-NMYXBGBTSA-N
- SMILES: Oryzanol A: CC(CCC=C(C)C)C1CCC2(C1(CCC34C2CCC5C3(C4)CCC(C5(C)C)OC(=O)/C=C/C6=CC(=C(C=C6)O)OC)C)C; Oryzanol C: CC(C)C(=C)CCC(C)C1CCC2(C1(CCC34C2CCC5C3(C4)CCC(C5(C)C)OC(=O)/C=C/C6=CC(=C(C=C6)O)OC)C)C; Campesteryl ferulate: C[C@H](CC[C@@H](C)C(C)C)[C@H]1CC[C@@H]2[C@@]1(CC[C@H]3[C@H]2CC=C4[C@@]3(CC[C@@H](C4)OC(=O)/C=C/C5=CC(=C(C=C5)O)OC)C)C

Properties
Chemical formula	Mixture
Appearance	White to off-white solid
- Except where otherwise noted, data are given for materials in their standard state (at 25 °C [77 °F], 100 kPa). Infobox references

γ-Oryzanol is a mixture of lipids derived from rice (Oryza sativa). γ-Oryzanol occurs mainly in the fat fraction of rice bran and rice bran oil.

Originally thought to be a single chemical compound, it is now known to be a mixture of ferulic acid esters of phytosterols and triterpenoids, particularly cycloartenyl ferulate, 24-methylenecycloartanyl ferulate, and campesteryl ferulate, which together account for 80% of γ-oryzanol.

== Composition ==
Major constituents of γ-oryzanol
Name(s)	Chemical structure	Molecular formula	CAS number
• Cycloartenyl ferulate • Oryzanol A		C_{40}H_{58}O_{4}	21238-33-5
• 24-Methylenecycloartanyl ferulate • Oryzanol C		C_{41}H_{60}O_{4}	469-36-3
• Campesteryl ferulate		C_{38}H_{56}O_{4}	20972-07-0

Minor constituents include Δ^{7}-stigmastenyl ferulate, stigmasteryl ferulate, Δ^{7}-campestenyl ferulate, Δ^{7}-sitostenyl ferulate, sitosteryl ferulate, compestanyl ferulate, and sitostanyl ferulate.

== Uses ==
γ-Oryzanol has been used in Japan for menopausal symptoms, mild anxiety, stomach upset, and high cholesterol. It is still approved in China for this use. However, there is no meaningful evidence supporting its efficacy for these purposes.

In the United States, it is sold as a sports supplement, but existing research does not support the belief that it has any ergogenic or testosterone-raising effects.
