= Hebao =

Chinese embroidery pouches

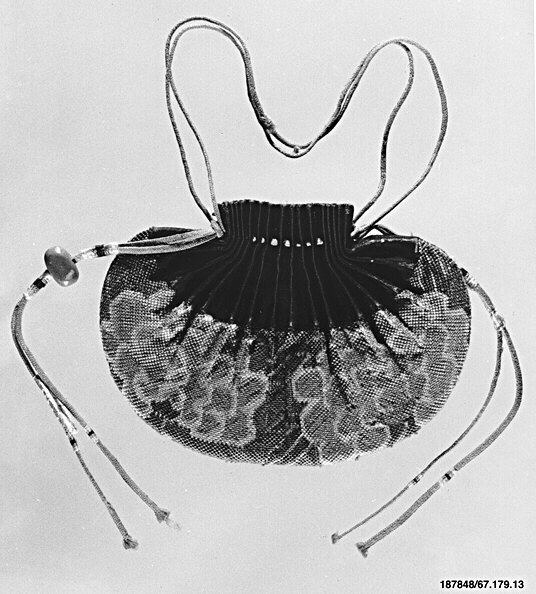
- Hebao, Qing dynasty, 19th century

Chinese name
- Chinese: 荷包
Transcriptions
Standard Mandarin
- Hanyu Pinyin: Hébāo

English name
- English: Propitious pouch

Hebao (Chinese: 荷包; pinyin: hébāo), sometimes referred as Propitious pouch in English, is a generic term used to refer to Chinese embroidery pouches, purses, or small bags. When they are used as Chinese perfume pouch (or sachet), they are referred to as Xiāngnáng (香囊; 'Fragrant sachet'), Xiāngbāo (香包; 'Fragrant bag'), or Xiāngdài (香袋). In everyday life, hebao are used to store items. In present-day China, xiangbao are still valued traditional gifts or token of fortune. Xiangbao are also used in Traditional Chinese medicine.

There are many ethnic groups in China which share the custom of wearing pouches. The hebao is also a type of adornment used in traditional Chinese clothing (including in hanfu and in the Manchu people's qizhuang). Manchu pouches are called fadu.

== Terminology ==
While the wearing of Chinese pouches can be traced back to the Pre-Qin dynasties or much earlier, the term of hebao only appeared after the Song dynasty.

== Cultural significance ==
=== Token of love ===
Hebao is also used as token of love since purses were personal items. They are used as a gift between young girls and boys and their acceptance towards each other. Chinese perfume pouches, xiangbao, are still valued items which are exchanged between lovers in the countryside.

Perfume pouches are also a love token for the ethnic Manchu; and when two youths fall in love, the boy is given a handmade perfume pouch by the girl. It is unknown when the perfume pouch became a pledge of romantic love. In Manchu culture, the pouch can also hold tobacco. Tobacco pouches are usually made by a wife for her husband or by a maiden for her lover.

It is also customary for the brides from the Yunnan ethnic minorities to sew hebao in advance prior to their wedding; they would then bring hebao to their bridegroom's home when they get married. The number of hebao they would require to make would depend on the numbers of people (e.g. musicians, singers and guests) who would attend their wedding ceremony. Ginkgo nuts, peanuts, sweets would be placed inside those pouches as a symbolism of 'giving birth to babies as soon as possible'.

=== Perfume pouches against the Five poisons ===
On the Dragon Boat Festival, Chinese mugwort would often be inserted in the hebao to exorcise the Five Poisons. These perfume sachets were called xiangbao (香包).

== Medical usage ==
Xiangbao is used in Traditional Chinese medicine. Wearing a Chinese medicine xiangbao to prevent to disease is a traditional practice known as dressing therapy. These medicine pouches are used to induce resuscitation, awaken consciousness, eliminate turbid pathogens with aromatics, invigorate organs (spleen and stomach), avoid plague and filth, repel mosquitoes and other insects.

== History ==
=== Hebao ===
The hebao was developed from the nangbao, a type of small bag which would keep one's money, handkerchief and other small items as ancient Chinese clothing did not have any pockets. The most common material for the making of nangbao was leather. The earliest nangbao had to be carried by hand or by back, but with time, the nangbao was improved by people by fastening it to their belts as the earliest nangbao were too inconvenient to carry.

The custom of wearing of pouches dates back to the pre-Qin dynasties period or earlier; the earliest unearthed Chinese pouch is one dating from the Spring and Autumn period and the Warring States period. (Note: This is according to the 2011 source article)

In the Southern and Northern dynasties, hebao became one of the most popular form of clothing adornment. They were worn at the waist and were used to carry items (such as seals, keys, handkerchiefs). Incense, pearls, jade, and other valuable items were placed inside the hebao to dispel evil spirits and foul smells.

In the Song dynasty, the term hebao referred to a small bag which would store carry-on valuables (e.g. money and personal seal). Since then, the custom of wearing hebao continued throughout the centuries through the late Qing dynasty and the early Republic of China. It then vanished in cities due to the clothing reforms when pockets became of common use. Despite its decline in common use, the hebao was still popular in some rural areas and ethnic minority areas in present-day China allowing the Chinese folk art to be transmitted to modern times.

=== Chinese perfume pouches/ xiangbao/ xiangnang/ xiangdai ===
It is also likely that the use of xiangbao is a custom which dates back to ancient times traditions, when people in ancient times used to carry a medicine bags when they would go hunting in order to drive poisonous insects away.

The tradition of carrying xiangbao can be traced back to the Duanwu festival, where a hebao would be filled with fragrant herbs and was embroidered with the patterns of the Five Poisons; it was meant to ward off evil spirits and wickedness while brings wealth and auspiciousness to its carrier. According to old sayings, these perfume pouches were made to commemorate Qu Yuan: when Qu Yuan drowned himself in the Miluo River, people living in the neighbouring Qin made and carried pouches stuffed with sweet grass and perfumes which Qu Yuan loved out of sympathy for the poet and to cherish his memory.

According to the Neize of the Liji (禮記•内则), respectful young people during this period wore a scented bag called jinying (衿纓) when they met their parents.

During the reign of Qin Shi Huang, perfume pouches were attached on the girdles of young men to show respect to their parents and their in-laws.

It is also believed that the use of xiangbao is a long tradition of the Han Chinese; the use of xiangbao can be traced back to the Tang dynasty when women living in rural areas would make perfume pouch (made of coloured silk, silk threads, gold and silver beads) in every year on the 4th lunar month.

By the Qing dynasty, xiangbao were not exclusively used on the Duanwu Festival; they were used on daily basis. Nearly everyone carried a xiangbao regardless of social classes, ages and gender. The Manchu also carried xiangbao all year round. Moreover, according to the Qing dynasty custom, the emperors and the empresses were required to carry a xiangbao on them all year round. The Qing emperors would also award perfume pouches to the princes and ministers to show his favour for them on important festivals or at the end of each year. Yùyòng hébāo (御用荷包), ornamented purses which were manufactured for the imperial palace, were an extraordinary mark of imperial favour and expressed the high regards which was held by the Qing emperor to his generals; the emperors only sent to those hebao to his highest generals.

Emperor Tongzhi and Emperor Guangxu used to perfume pouches when choosing their empresses: after having examined all the girls who were lined up in front of him, the Emperor would hang a xiangbao on the button of the dress of the girls whom he preferred. Xiangbao were used extensively by the common people regardless of gender and ages; they would carry perfume pouches and give it to others as presents while young men and women would often use it as a toke of love. Xiangbao were appreciated for their fragrance but they were also considered as a preventive against diseases.

=== Manchu pouch/ fadu ===
The fadu of the Manchu people originated from a form of bag used by the ancestors of the Manchu who lived a hunting life through dense forested mountains. The bag was originally made of out animal hide and was worn at the waist; it was secured on the belt to carry meals. Later on, when the ancestors of the Manchu left the mountain regions and began an agricultural life, the hide bag was developed into a small and delicate accessory which would contain snacks. Manchu women would use small pieces of silk and satin to the sew the bag and would decorate it with embroidery patterns of flowers and birds. They would also use their pouches to carry perfume and tobacco.

== Construction and design ==
Hebao is a bag composed of 2 sides: the interior and exterior side. It is often embroidered on its outside while the inside is made of a thick layer of fabric. The opening of the bag is threaded with a silk string that can tightened and loosened. They are made in various shapes, such as rotund, oblong, peach, ruyi, and guava. They also have different patterns for different usages: butterflies and flowers represented the wish for love and marriage; golden melons and children represented the wishes for longevity and more children; images of qilin represented the wishes for carrying a son. Each area in China has a distinctive form of hebao.

=== Manchu's tobacco pouch ===
The Manchu people's tobacco pouch is tied with a small wooden gourd which is carved with rich patterns. The gourd acts primarily as a fastener to prevent its carrier from losing their pouch. The carving makes harder for the fastener to slip from the seam between the waist and the cloth belt.

=== Yuyong hebao ===
Yùyòng hébāo (御用荷包) were the ornamented purses made for the imperial palace and were bestowed to the highest generals favoured by the Emperor in the Qing dynasty as a symbol of favour and high regards. They usually came into 2 sizes: either large or small. They could be bestowed as a single purse, in pairs, or in numbers up to 4. These hebao could also contains gems, jewels and precious metals, such as shanhu (corals), qizhen babao (lit. "seven pearls and eight jewels"), jinding (gold ingot), yinding (silver ingots), jinqian (gold coins) and yinqian (silver coins).

== Ways of wearing ==
=== Manchu ethnic ===
Manchu people regardless of gender wore pouches, but they wore it differently according to their gender. Men wore their pouches at the waist while women tied their pouches to the 2nd buttons of their traditional Manchu dress, qizhuang.

== Popular culture ==
=== Literature and stories ===
In the Dream of the Red Chamber, a hebao is personally made by Daiyu and is given to Baoyu as an expression of her love for him; however, she misunderstood that Baoyu had deliberately given the purse away and destroyed the other hebao that she was making. In reality, Baoyu treasured the hebao so much that he would have never given it away.

=== Music and songs ===
"Embroidering a pouch" (绣荷包; Huguang diao), originally from the regions of Hunan and Guangdong, has been a popular song since the Ming and Qing dynasties. Chinese folks about embroidering hebao are sung in all parts of China, with the most familiar ones being the ones in Shanxi, Yunnan, and Sichuan. These songs depict the thoughts of young girls who miss their lovers and are personally embroidering a hebao for their beloved.

== Similar items ==
- Qiedai - Eggplant-shaped purses worn by imperial officials in ancient China.
- Qingyang sachet
- Sachet
- Yudai - Fish-shaped tally bag; a pouch used in ancient China as a form of yufu (fish tally).

== See also ==
- Hanfu
- List of hanfu
- List of hanfu accessories
