= Rice bran oil =

Oil extracted from the hard outer brown layer of rice

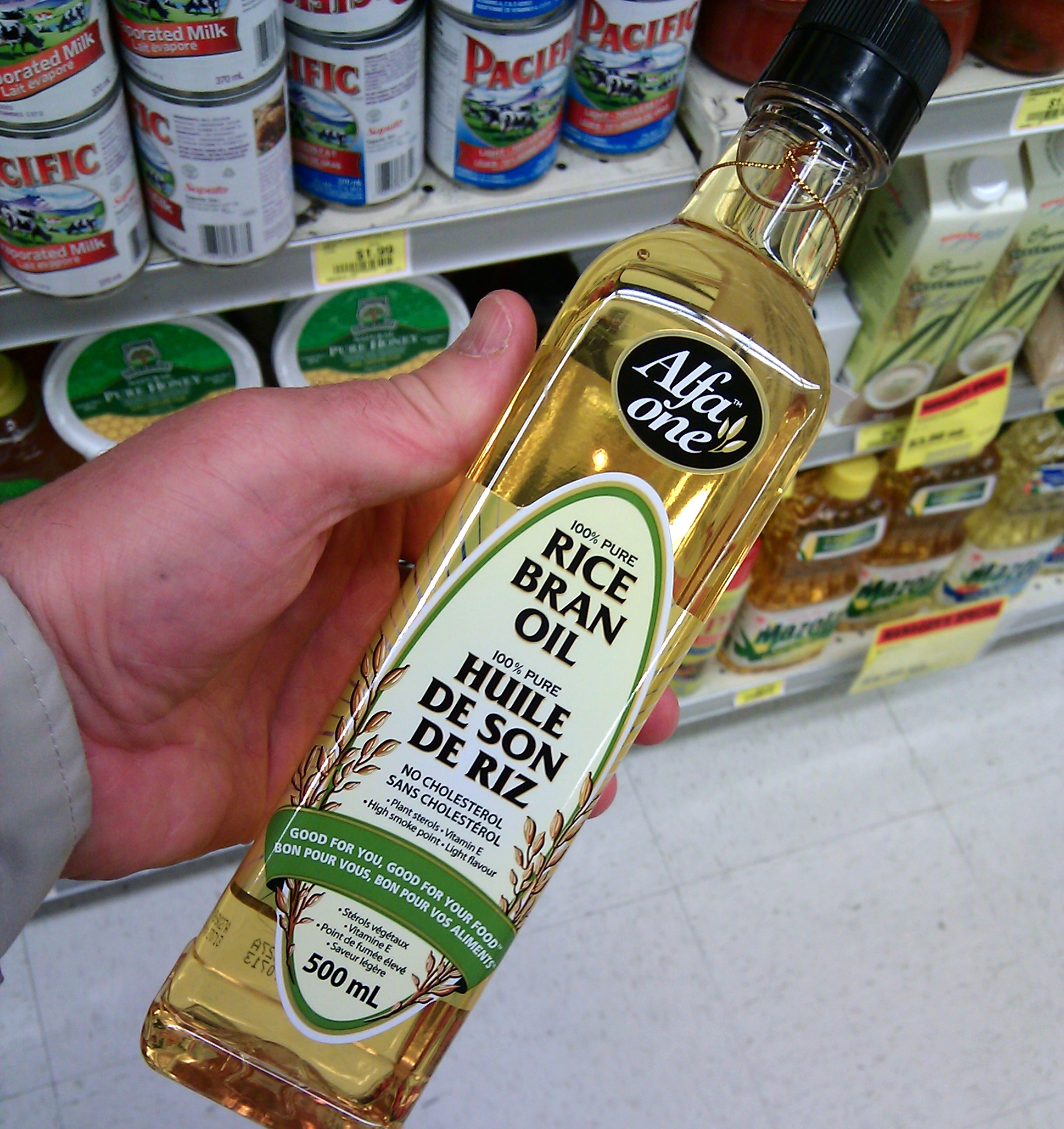
- Bottle of rice bran oil

Fat composition

Saturated fats
- Total saturated: 25% Myristic: 0.6% Palmitic: 21.5% Stearic: 2.9%

Unsaturated fats
- Total unsaturated: 75%
- Monounsaturated: 38%
- Oleic acid: 38%
- Polyunsaturated: 37%
- Omega−3 fatty acids: α-Linolenic: 2.2%
- Omega−6 fatty acids: Linoleic: 34.4%

Properties
- Food energy per 100 g (3.5 oz): 3,700 kJ (880 kcal)
- Smoke point: 232 °C (450 °F)
- Iodine value: 99-108
- Acid value: 1.2
- Saponification value: 180-190
- Unsaponifiable: 3-5

Rice bran oil is the oil extracted from the hard outer brown layer of rice called bran. It is known for its high smoke point of 232 °C (450 °F) and mild flavor, making it suitable for high-temperature cooking methods such as stir frying and deep frying. It is popular as a cooking oil across East Asia, South Asia, and Southeast Asia, including India, Nepal, Bangladesh, Indonesia, Japan, Southern China and Malaysia.

== Composition and properties ==
Rice bran oil has a composition similar to that of peanut oil, with 38% monounsaturated, 37% polyunsaturated, and 25% saturated fatty acids.

A component of rice bran oil is the γ-oryzanol, at around 2% of crude oil content. Thought to be a single compound when initially isolated, γ-oryzanol is now known to be a mixture of steryl and other triterpenyl esters of ferulic acids. Also present are tocopherols and tocotrienols (two types of vitamin E) and phytosterols.

Fatty acid composition

Fatty acid	Lipid number	Percentage
Myristic acid	C14:0	0.6%
Palmitic acid	C16:0	21.5%
Stearic acid	C18:0	2.9%
Oleic acid (an omega-9 fatty acid)	C18:1	38.4%
Linoleic acid (LA, an omega-6 fatty acid)	C18:2	34.4%
α-Linolenic acid (ALA, an omega-3 fatty acid)	C18:3	2.2%

Physical properties of crude and refined rice bran oil

Property	Crude rice bran oil	Refined oil
Moisture	0.5–1.0%	0.1–0.15%
Density (15 °C)	0.913–0.920	0.913–0.920
Refractive index	1.4672	1.4672
Iodine value	85–100	95–104
Saponification value	187	187
Unsaponifiable matter	4.5–5.5	1.8–2.5
Free fatty acids	5–15%	0.15–0.2%
Oryzanol	2.0	1.5–1.8
Tocopherol	0.15	0.05
Color (tintometer)	20Y+2.8R	10Y+1.0R

== Research ==
Rice bran oil consumption has been found to significantly decrease total cholesterol (TC), LDL-C and triglyceride (TG) levels.

== Uses ==
Rice bran oil is an edible oil which is used in various forms of food preparation. It is also the basis of some vegetable ghee. Rice bran wax, obtained from rice bran oil, is used as a substitute for carnauba wax in cosmetics, confectionery, shoe creams, and polishing compounds.

Isolated γ-oryzanol from rice bran oil is available in China as an over-the-counter drug, and in other countries as a dietary supplement. There is no meaningful evidence supporting its efficacy for treating any medical condition.

== Comparison to other vegetable oils ==
Properties of vegetable oils The nutritional values are expressed as percent (%) by mass of total fat.
Type	Processing treatment	Saturated fatty acids	Monounsaturated fatty acids		Polyunsaturated fatty acids				Smoke point
Type	Processing treatment	Saturated fatty acids	Total	Oleic acid (ω−9)	Total	α-Linolenic acid (ω−3)	Linoleic acid (ω−6)	ω−6:3 ratio	Smoke point
Avocado		11.6	70.6	67.9	13.5	1	12.5	12.5:1	250 °C (482 °F)
Brazil nut		17.6	26.7	26.1	55.7	0.1	55.6	457:1	208 °C (406 °F)
Canola		7.4	63.3	61.8	28.1	9.1	18.6	2:1	204 °C (400 °F)
Coconut		82.5	6.3	6	1.7	0.019	1.68	88:1	175 °C (347 °F)
Corn		12.9	27.6	27.3	54.7	1	58	58:1	232 °C (450 °F)
Cottonseed		25.9	17.8	19	51.9	1	54	54:1	216 °C (420 °F)
Cottonseed	hydrogenated	93.6	1.5		0.6	0.2	0.3	1.5:1	
Flaxseed/linseed		9.0	18.4	18	67.8	53	13	0.2:1	107 °C (225 °F)
Grape seed		9.6	16.1	15.8	69.9	0.10	69.6	very high	216 °C (421 °F)
Hemp seed		7.0	9.0	9.0	82.0	22.0	54.0	2.5:1	166 °C (330 °F)
High-oleic safflower oil		7.5	75.2	75.2	12.8	0	12.8	very high	212 °C (414 °F)
Olive (extra virgin)		13.8	73.0	71.3	10.5	0.7	9.8	14:1	193 °C (380 °F)
Palm		49.3	37.0	40	9.3	0.2	9.1	45.5:1	235 °C (455 °F)
Palm	hydrogenated	88.2	5.7		0				
Peanut		16.2	57.1	55.4	19.9	0.318	19.6	61.6:1	232 °C (450 °F)
Rice bran oil		25	38.4	38.4	36.6	2.2	34.4	15.6:1	232 °C (450 °F)
Sesame		14.2	39.7	39.3	41.7	0.3	41.3	138:1	
Soybean		15.6	22.8	22.6	57.7	7	51	7.3:1	238 °C (460 °F)
Soybean	partially hydrogenated	14.9	43.0	42.5	37.6	2.6	34.9	13.4:1	
Sunflower oil		8.99	63.4	62.9	20.7	0.16	20.5	128:1	227 °C (440 °F)
Walnut oil	unrefined	9.1	22.8	22.2	63.3	10.4	52.9	5:1	160 °C (320 °F)

== See also ==
- Cereal germ
- Bran
- Rice germ oil
- Wheat germ oil
- Wheat bran oil
- Yushō disease
