= Wheat germ oil =

Oil extracted from the embryo of a wheat seed

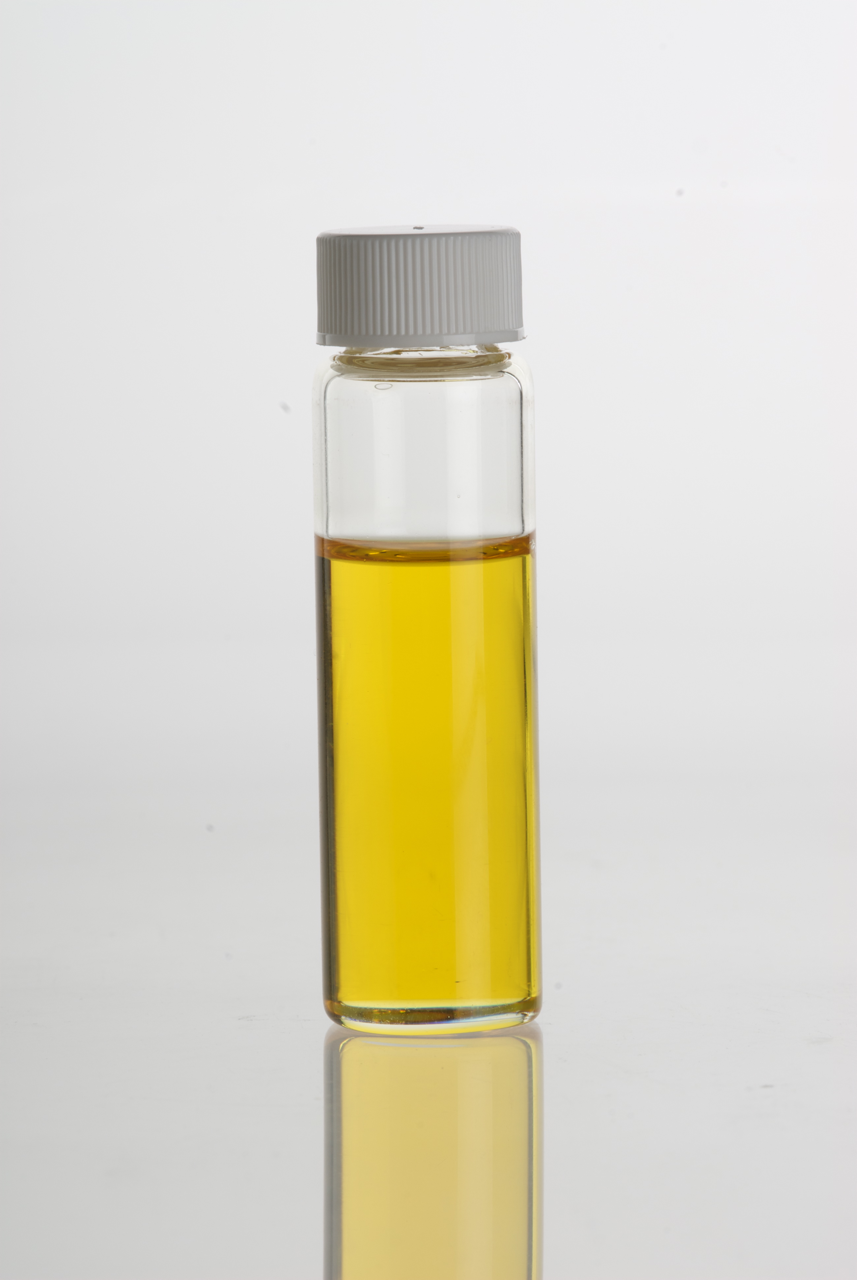
Wheat germ oil in a clear glass vial

Wheat germ oil is extracted from the germ of the wheat kernel, which makes up 2-3% by weight of whole grain wheat. Wheat germ may yield 8-14% of oil in its total content.

In a reference amount of 100 grams (3.5 oz), wheat germ oil supplies 884 calories. Wheat germ oil has a high content of vitamin E (149 mg/100g), the content of which diminishes substantially due to oxidation by extrusion treatment, oven-roasting or storage for 6 weeks. As a cooking oil, it is strongly flavored and easily perishable.

Wheat germ oil contains the following fatty acids:

Component	g/100g
Linoleic acid (omega-6)	55
Palmitic acid	17
Oleic acid	15
Linolenic acid (omega-3)	7

Wheat germ oil is rich in phytosterols, especially campesterol and beta-sitosterol, which remain stable in content during long-term storage. It also contains octacosanol, a 28-carbon long-chain sterol found in vegetable waxes.

== See also ==
- Rice bran oil
