= Sari-sari store =

Small convenience store in the Philippines

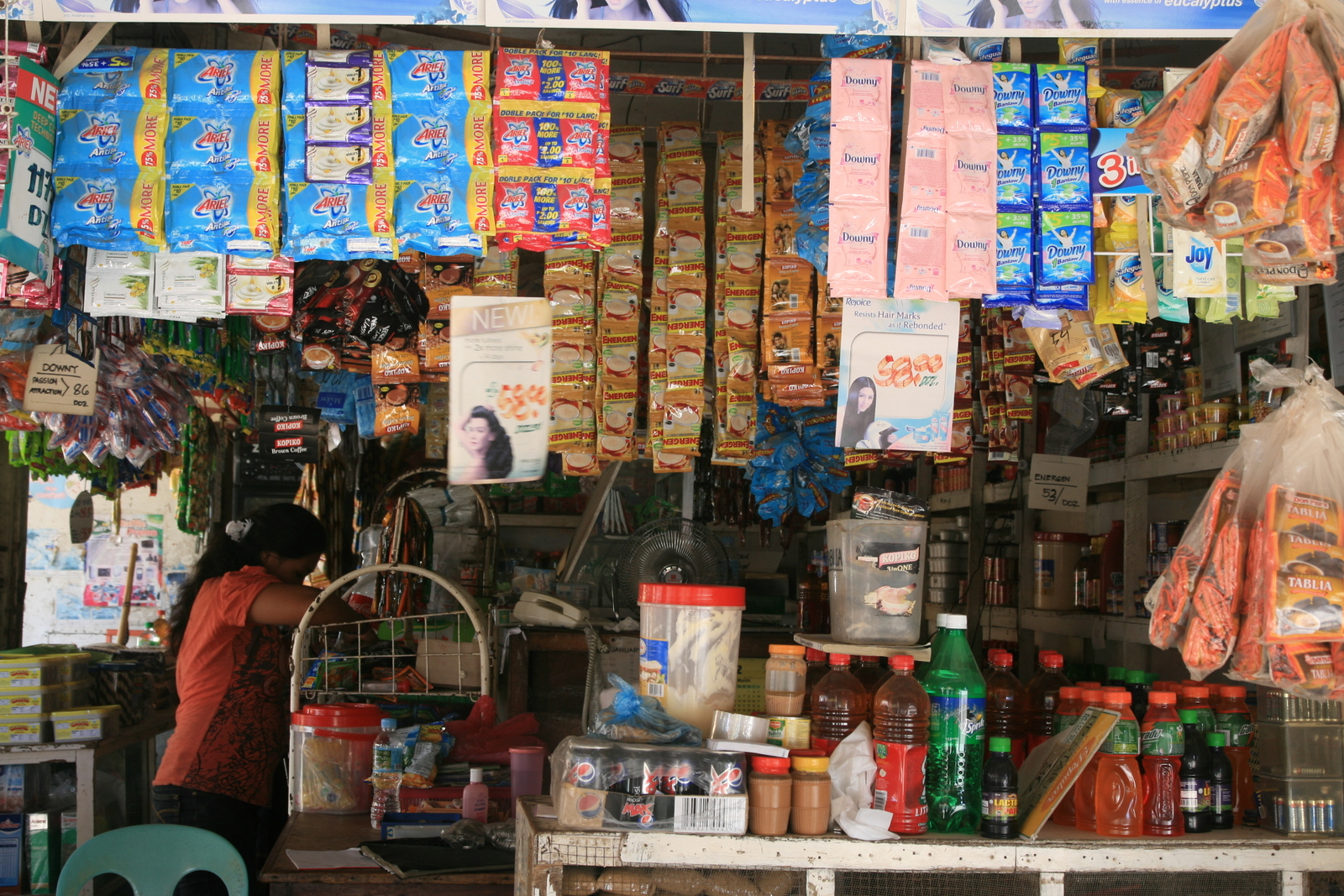
A typical sari-sari store in Bantayan

A sari-sari store, anglicized as neighborhood sundry store, is a convenience store found in the Philippines. The word sari-sari is Tagalog meaning "variety" or "sundry". Such stores occupy an important economic and social location in a Filipino community and are ubiquitous in neighborhoods and along streets. Sari-sari stores tend to be family-run and privately owned operating within the shopkeeper's residence.

Commodities are displayed in a large screen-covered or metal-barred window in front of the shop. Candies in recycled jars, canned goods, and cigarettes are displayed while cooking oil, salt, and sugar are stored at the back of the shop. Prepaid mobile phone credits are provided. The sari-sari store operates with a small revolving fund, and it generally does not offer perishable goods requiring refrigeration. The few that do have refrigerators carry soft drinks, beers, and bottled water.

== Economic value ==
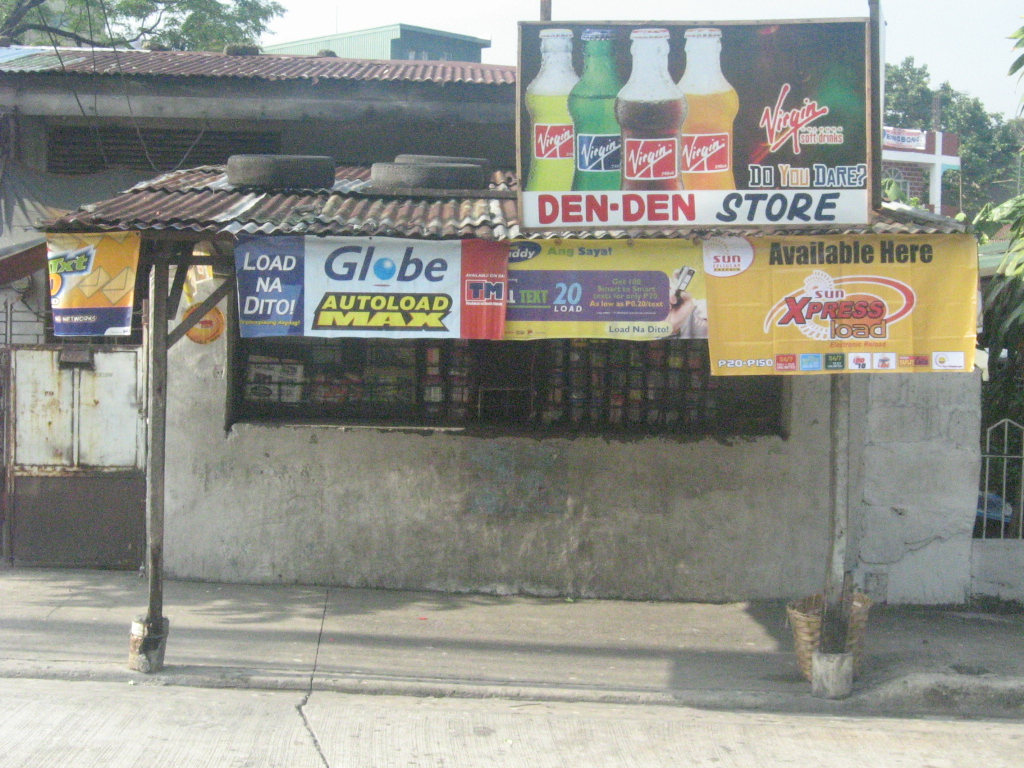
Privilege signage on a sari-sari store in Quezon City

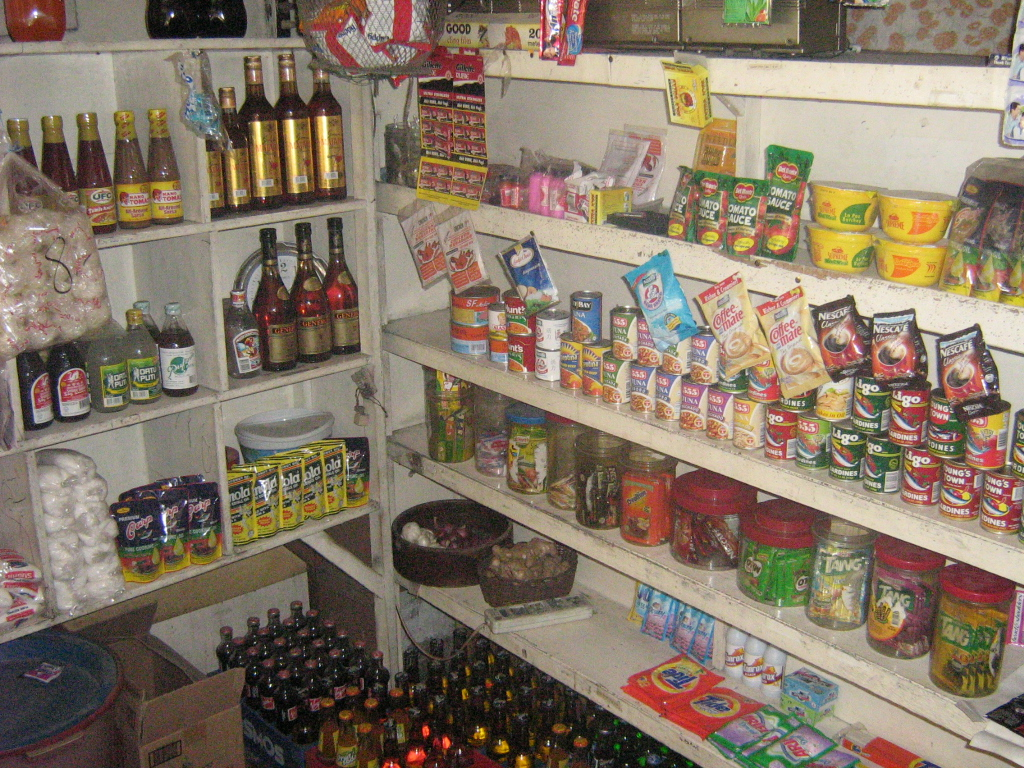
Inside a sari-sari store.

Sari-sari stores play a vital role in the Philippine economy, particularly at the grassroots level. These micro-enterprises contribute significantly to the country's domestic retail market and gross domestic product (GDP).

According to the Magna Kultura Foundation, sari-sari stores account for approximately 70% of sales of manufactured consumer food products nationwide. With an estimated 800,000 stores across the country, they hold a substantial portion of the domestic retail market. In 2011, the retail sector, consisting largely of micro, small, and medium-sized enterprises (MSMEs) like sari-sari stores, contributed 13% (₱1.3 trillion) to the Philippines' GDP of ₱9.7 trillion.

Sari-sari stores typically operate with a low markup, averaging 10%, compared to 20% for convenience stores like 7-Eleven. This makes them a popular choice for Filipinos. Although prices may be higher than those in supermarkets, sari-sari stores offer convenient access to basic commodities, especially in rural areas where larger markets are scarce.

In the Philippines, following the concept of tingi or retail, customers can buy 'units' of a product rather than a whole package, making it affordable to those with limited budgets. For example, one can buy a single cigarette for ₱5 (US$0.1) rather than a whole pack.

The sari-sari store saves customers from paying extra transportation costs, especially in rural areas, since some towns can be very far from the nearest market or grocery. The store may also allow purchases on credit from its "suki" (repeat customers known to the store owners). They usually keep analogue record of their customers' outstanding balances in school notebooks or the like and demand payments on paydays. In rural areas, the stores act as trading centers where farmers and fishermen trade their products for basic articles, fuel, and other supplies.

The owners can buy grocery commodities in bulk, and then sell them in-store at a mark-up. Trucks deliver LPG tanks and soft drinks directly to the store. The store requires minimal investment, using a portion of its home as storage and display space.

The lifespan of sari-sari stores is highly variable, with many closing after a few weeks due to insufficient income or management mishandling by owners who have limited formal schooling.

Some stores operate without necessary permits, leading to legal issues. In response to both the economic impact of the COVID-19 pandemic and regulatory challenges, some local government units (LGUs) have enacted ordinances waiving taxes and certain permits to sari-sari store and carinderia owners–especially those operating illicitly without regulatory compliance–to help legitimize their businesses and further integrate them into the mainstream economy.

Since June 2024, the nationwide transition into digitalized accounting for sari-sari stores is currently underway through the Department of Trade and Industry's Sari-Sari Store Advancement Program.

== Social value ==
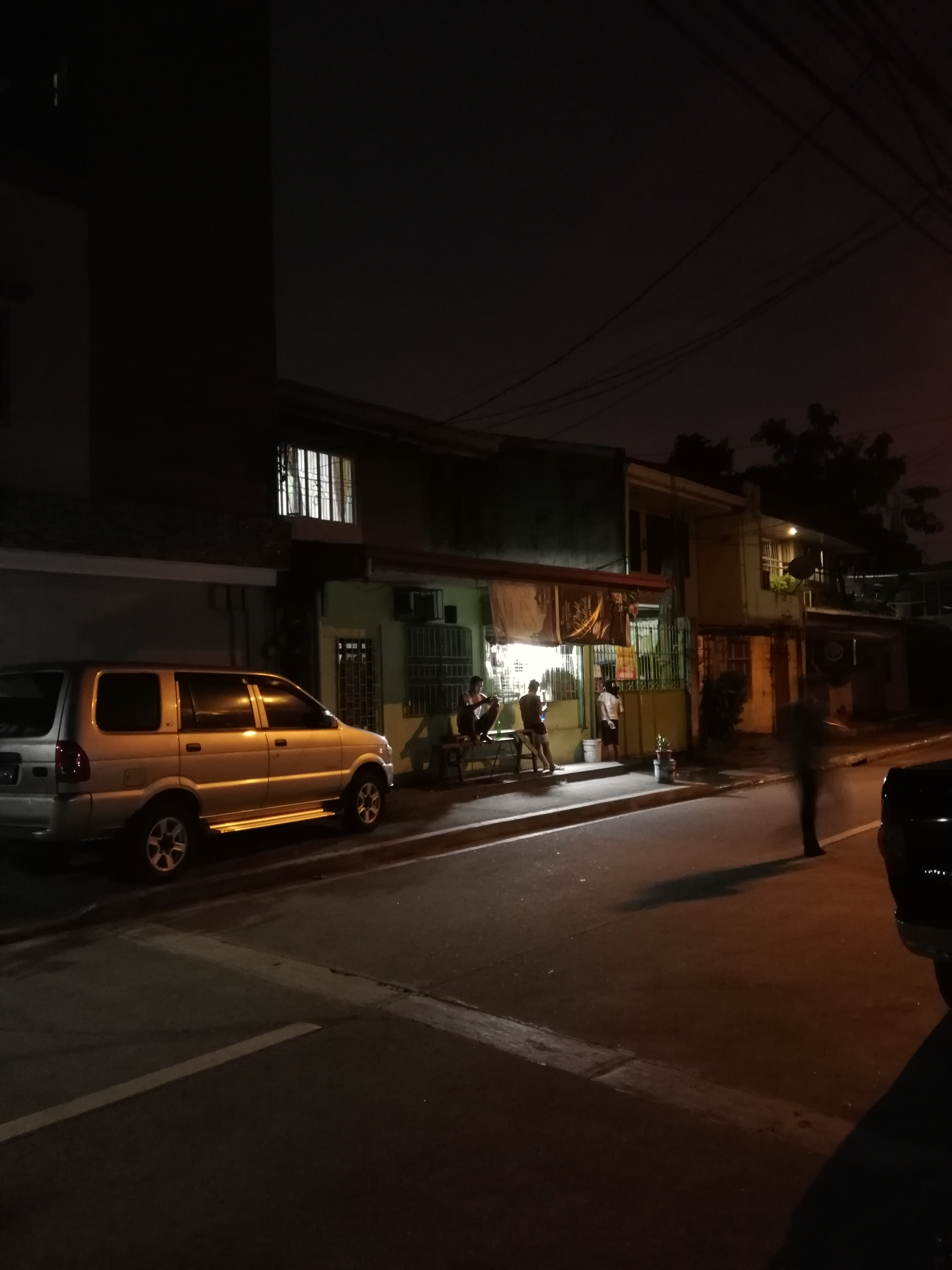
Sari-sari store at night, in Quezon City. Often these stores serve as places to gather and to socialize by many Filipinos.

The Magna Kultura Foundation notes that the sari-sari store is part of Philippine culture, and it has become an integral part of every Filipino’s life. It is a constant feature of residential neighborhoods in the Philippines, both in rural and urban areas, proliferating even in the poorest communities. About ninety-three percent (93%) of all sari-sari stores nationwide are located in residential communities.

Any essential household good that might be missing from one’s pantry – from basic food items like sugar, coffee, and cooking condiments, to other necessities like soap or shampoo, is most conveniently purchased from the nearby sari-sari store at economically sized quantities that are affordable to common citizens. The sari-sari store offers a place where people can meet. The benches provided in front of the store are usually occupied by local people; some men spend time drinking there while women discuss the latest local news, youths also use the place to hang out and children also rest there in the afternoons after playing and buy soft drinks and snacks.

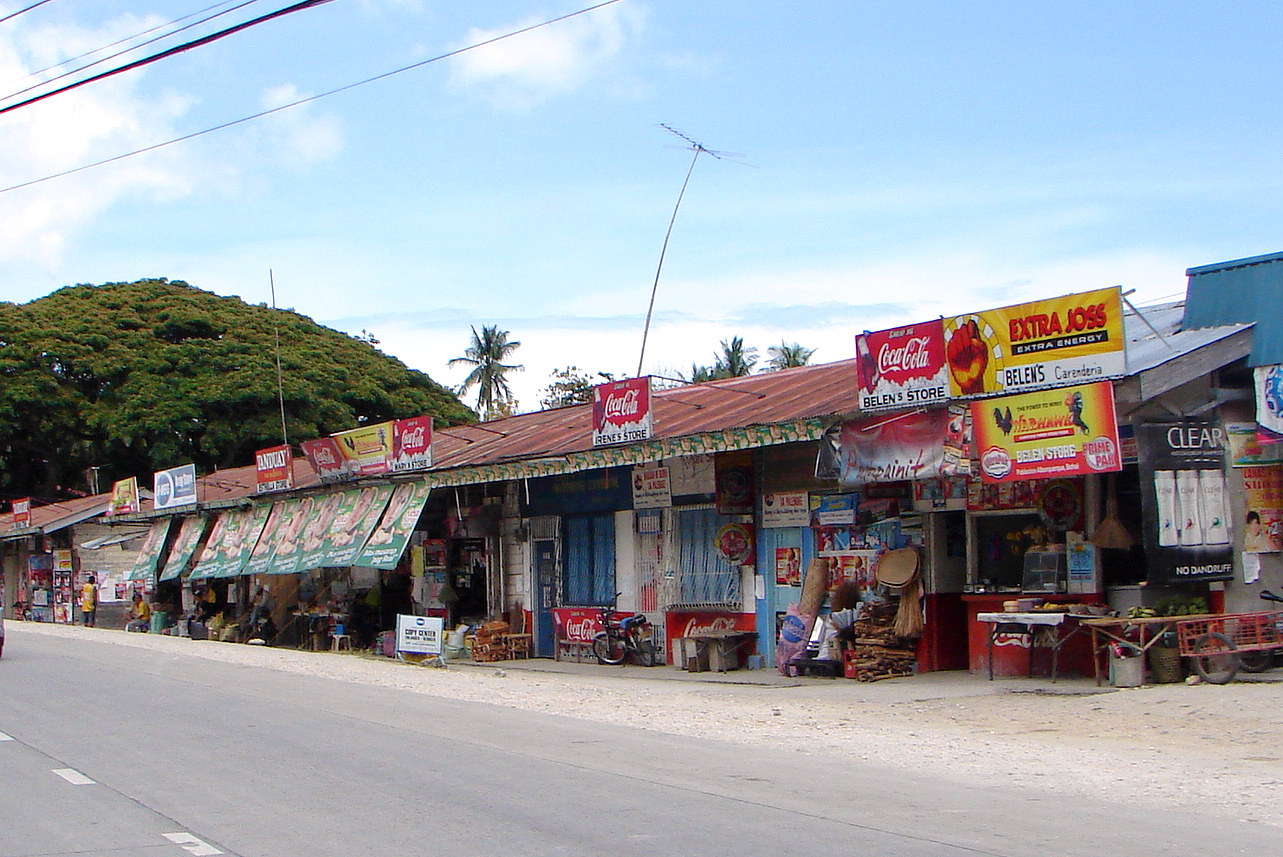
Sari-sari stores in Alburquerque, Bohol.

== In popular culture ==
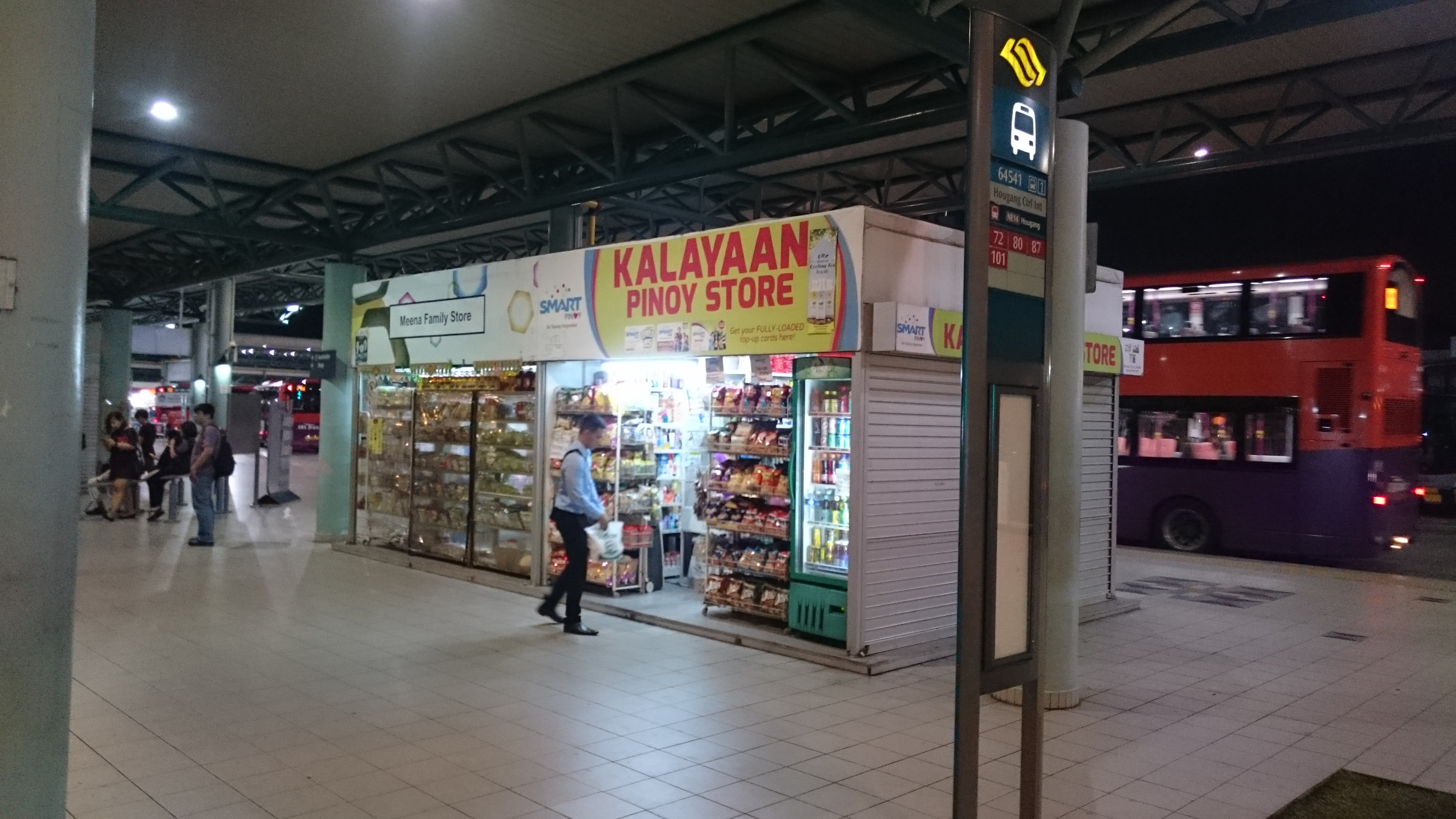
Sari-sari store in Hougang Bus Interchange, Singapore.

- Pinoy rock band Eraserheads' song "Tindahan ni Aling Nena" ("Aling Nena's Store"; from the album UltraElectroMagneticPop!) tells the story of a man buying food at a sari-sari store and his attempts to court the eponymous store owner's daughter. It is described as a song about the love between young people with limited economic means.

== See also ==
- Vulcanizing shop
- Toko
- Warung
- Kopi tiam
- Mamak stall
