= Rice polisher =

Machine for polishing kernels of rice

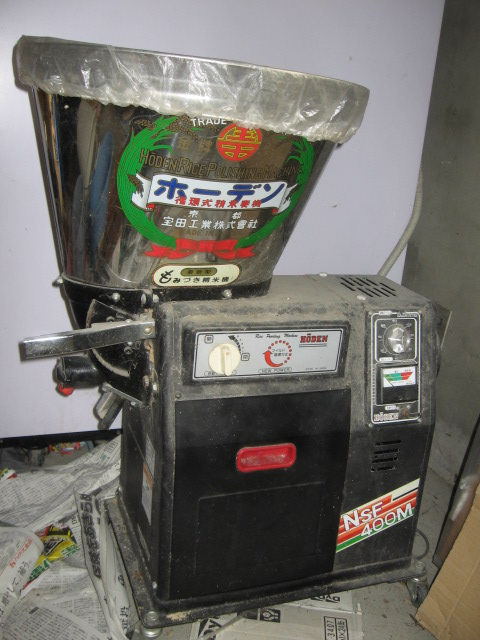
A rice polisher

A rice polisher is a machine for buffing (or "polishing") kernels of rice to change their appearance, taste, and texture or for transforming brown rice into white rice.

== Use ==
Rice polishers are used after the rice has gone through the whitening process. They are abrasive machines that use talc or some other very fine dust to buff the outer surface of rice kernels. In Japanese farming communities, there is often a shared rice polishing machine. The first fully automated rice polishing machine is believed to have been patented by the English engineer and inventor Sampson Moore in 1861. In the 20th century, kitchen appliances for consumers were created that allowed individual cooks to polish rice in their homes.

== Components ==
The polisher contains cones covered with leather strips and perforated screens. The leather strips on the cones rub the grain of rice over the screen repeatedly. The remaining particles on the rice are removed during this process, giving the grain of rice a shinier appearance.

There is a suction fan within the polisher that keeps the rice cool as it travels through the polishing process and lowers the percentage of broken rice. The suction fan also catches any loose talc or dust that is lost throughout the process.

== Types ==
- Vertical cone polisher: This machine uses a covered cone within a perforated screen to create an abrasive surface for polishing rice.
- Horizontal polisher: This machine uses a cylinder covered in emery that is placed within another cylinder and rotated to polish the rice.

== See also ==
- Rice cooker, a kitchen appliance that automates the cooking of rice, and may maintain rice hot, ready to eat
- Rice huller, a machine that removes the chaff or outer fibrous hull from grains of rice
- Rice preparation, processing of rice
