= Rice huller =

Machine for processing whole rice

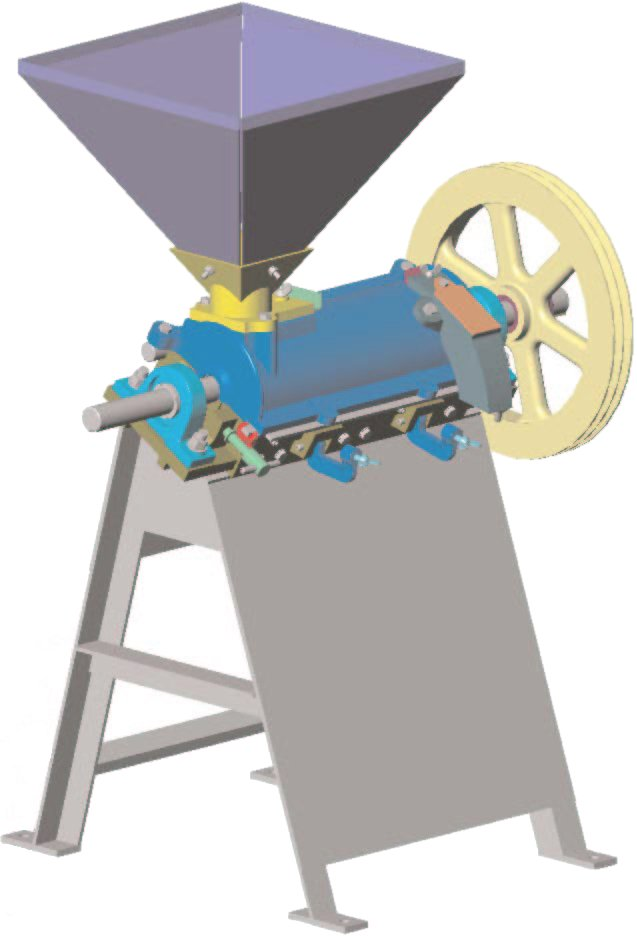
A rice huller able to use several sources of power

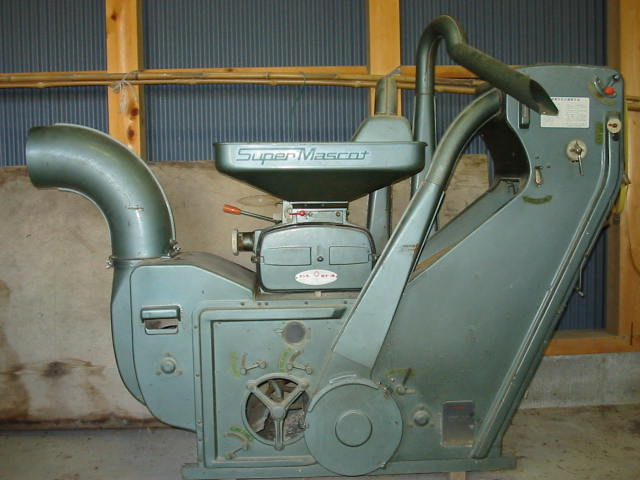
An old-type mechanical huller, driven by a gasoline engine

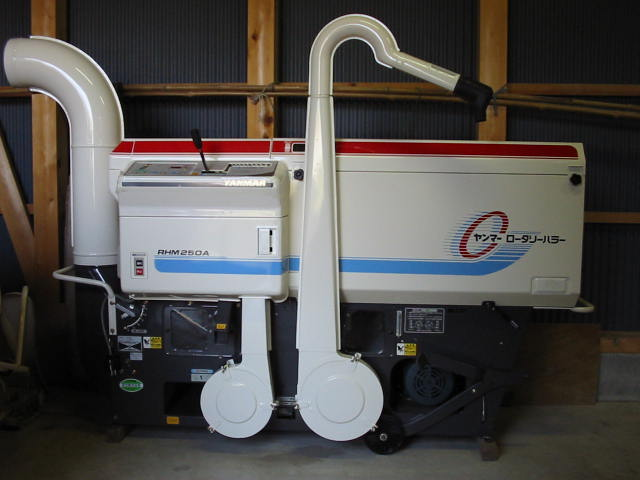
An electric rotary huller

A rice huller or rice husker is an agricultural machine used to automate the process of removing the chaff (the outer husks) of grains of rice. Throughout history, there have been numerous techniques to hull rice. Traditionally, it would be pounded using some form of mortar and pestle. An early simple machine to do this is a rice pounder. Later even more efficient machinery was developed to hull and polish rice. These machines are most widely developed and used throughout Asia, the most popular modern type in use today is the Engelberg huller designed by German Brazilian engineer Evaristo Conrado Engelberg in Brazil and first patented in 1885.

The Engelberg huller uses steel rollers to remove the husk. Other types of huller include the disk or cono huller which uses an abrasive rotating disk to first remove the husk before passing the grain to conical rollers which polish it to make white rice; this is done repeatedly since other sides of circular side of rice are not husked. Rubber rollers may be used to reduce the amount of breakage of the grains, so increasing the yield of the best quality head rice, but the rubber rollers tend to require frequent replacement, which can be a significant drawback.

== Sample mechanism for the husk ==
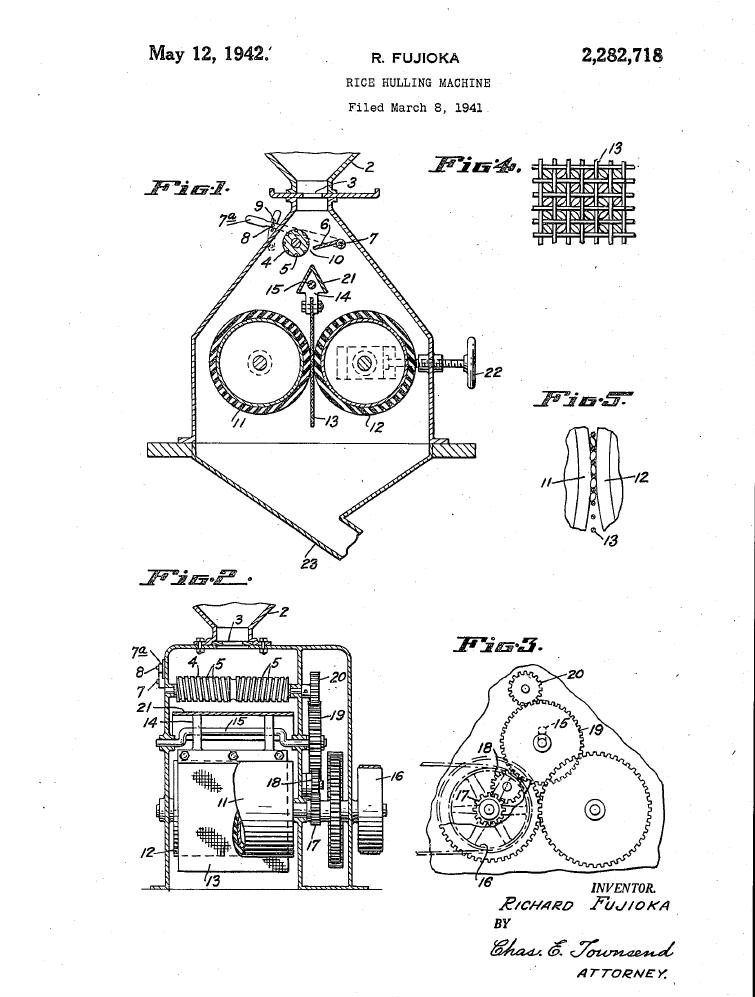
Drawing of the mechanism of a rice hulling machine from 1942

== See also ==
- Rice hulls
- Rice polisher
- Rice pounder, an earlier simple tool to dehull rice
- Threshing machine, a general machine to remove the grains from the straw or panicles
- Winnowing barn, a previous method of hulling in commercial rice growing
