= Evaristo Conrado Engelberg =

Brazilian mechanical engineer

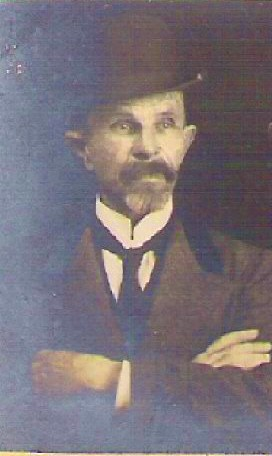
- Born: 26 October 1853; Piracicaba, São Paulo, Empire of Brazil
- Died: 1932 (aged 78–79); Piracicaba, São Paulo, Brazil
- Occupations: mechanical engineer, inventor and businessman

Evaristo Conrado Engelberg (26 October 1853–1932) was a Brazilian mechanical engineer and inventor. He is the inventor of the Engelberg huller, a machine used to strip the husks from rice and coffee during harvest. He was born to German immigrants in Piracicaba, São Paulo.

In 1885, while constructing a water wheel, Engelberg observed a group of slaves stripping rice pestles by hand, the main method at the time. He discovered that rubbing the rice between his fingers while applying pressure removed the pestle. He returned to his workshop and immediately began working on a machine that he finished the next day, thus creating the first rice peeler horizontal cylinder. The invention was named the Engelberg Huller and was soon adapted to also work with coffee. The machine revolutionized the processing of coffee and rice.

There was some initial resistance to the machine from ranchers and farmers, who preferred to use slave labor throughout the year for these and other processes, rather than investing the money in the machines invented by Engelberg, which would be useful only during harvest. Despite this initial resistance, the peelers was eventually adopted by major growers of the region. With the strong development of his business, in June 1885, Engelberg partnered with Earl Siciliano to found Engelberg & Siciliano which was headquartered in Piracicaba.

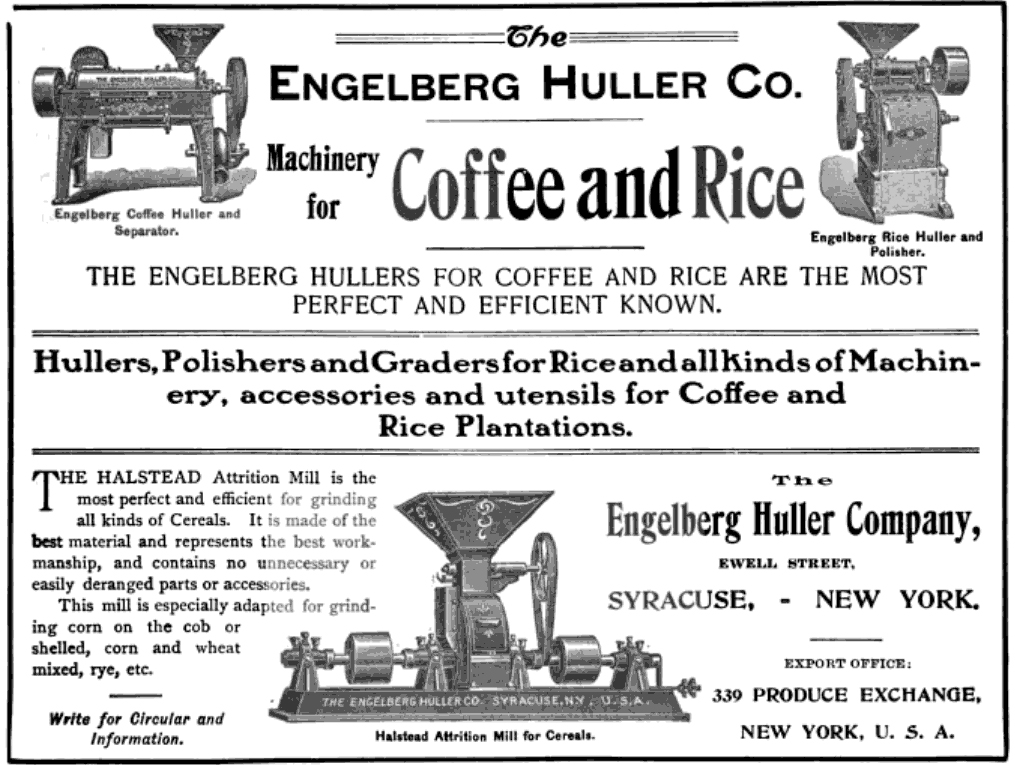
A c.1903 advertisement for the Engelberg Huller Company

In 1890, the Gazeta de Piracicaba reported that Engelberg was appointed a member of the Parisian Academy of Inventors, and awarded a gold medal for his invention. Engelberg patented several models of these machines in the United States and Europe. He enjoyed huge success, because the stripper did not squeeze the coffee beans, and removed all the straw while maintaining the beans' integrity, producing a higher yield. The maintenance of the machines was also quite simple and inexpensive, which was advantageous, because the main methods of cleaning the coffee still depended on slave labor in mills.

As international demand for his machine increased, Engelberg partnered with José Tibiriçá to create a branch of his company in Syracuse, New York, known as the Engelberg Huller Company. Production in Brazil was halted in 1890 and as early as 1922, the machines produced in Syracuse began to be shipped and sold in Brazil. As of 2011, the Syracuse-based branch of the Engelber Huller Company continues to produce hullers and associated parts.
