= Sachet =

Small cloth scented bag filled with herbs

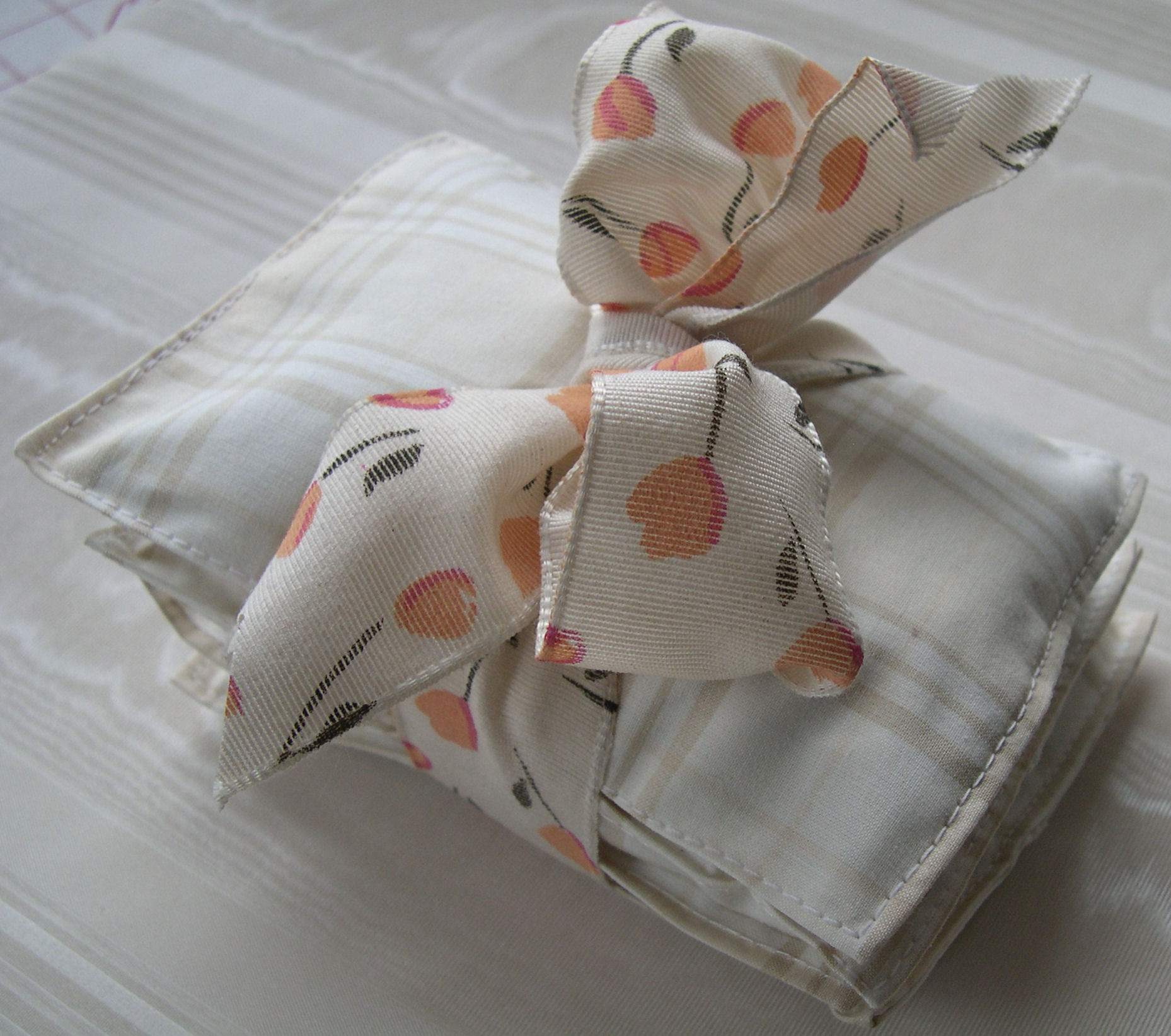
A handmade sachet containing lavender.

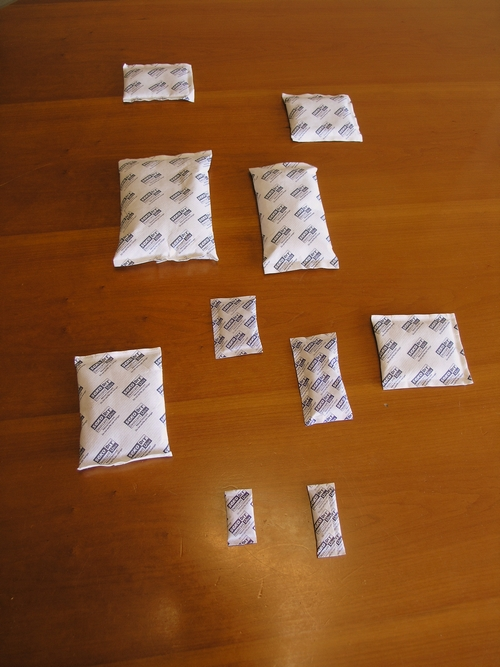
Sachets containing desiccants

Although its most usual definition is that listed under "packet" (see link above), a sachet (/ˈsæʃeɪ/ sash-ay) can also mean a small scented cloth bag filled with herbs, potpourri, or aromatic ingredients; or a small porous bag or packet containing a material intended to interact with its atmosphere; for example, desiccants are usually packed in sachets which are then placed in larger packages. Cotton, linen or organza are used to create the bag.

== Cultural history ==
During the Chinese Warring States period a scented sachet (xiangbao) was an ornament worn on the body and used to absorb sweat, repel insects and ward off evils. In medieval Europe the sachet was known as a "plague-bag".

In various Indian cuisines, a "potli bag" is used to contain whole spices, so that they may be easily separated from the food after cooking. They are also used as fashion ornaments unto themselves.

== Gallery ==
Scented sachets
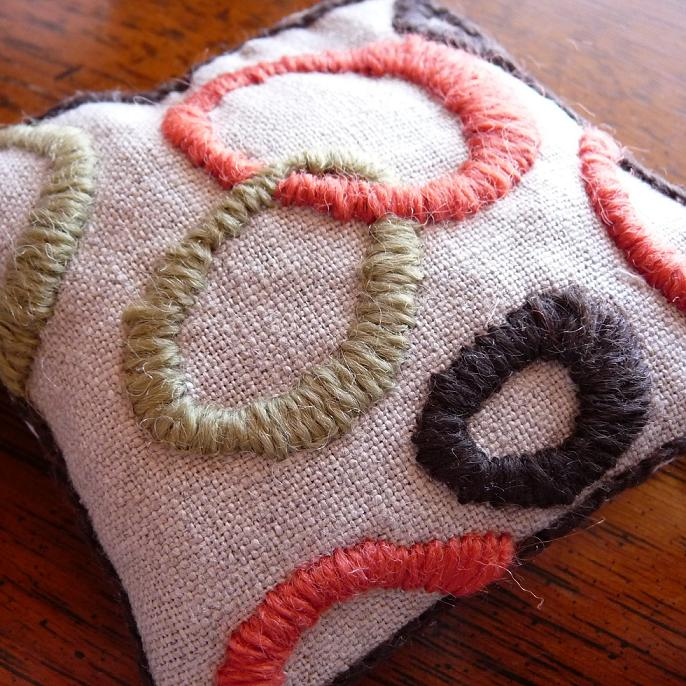

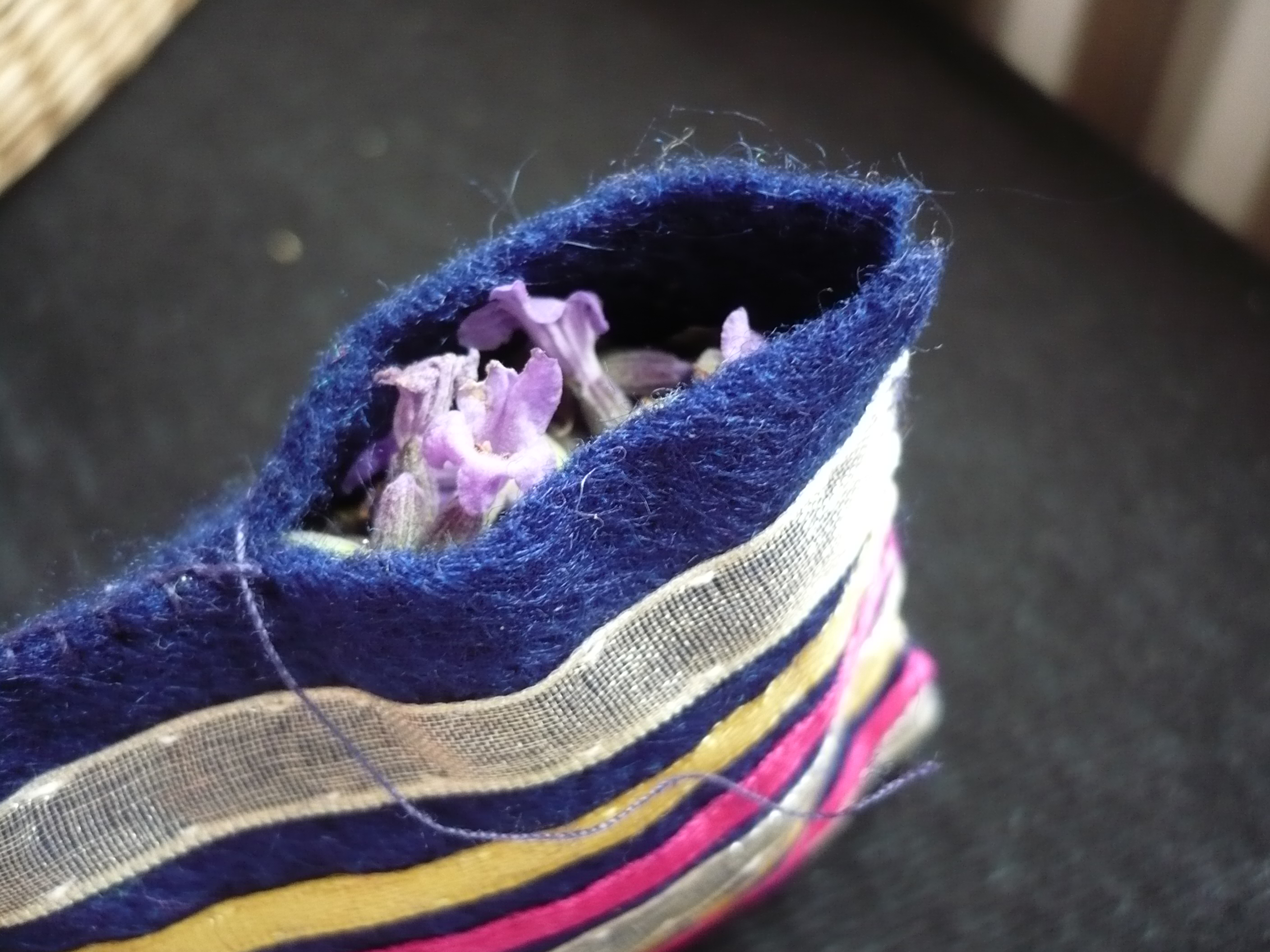

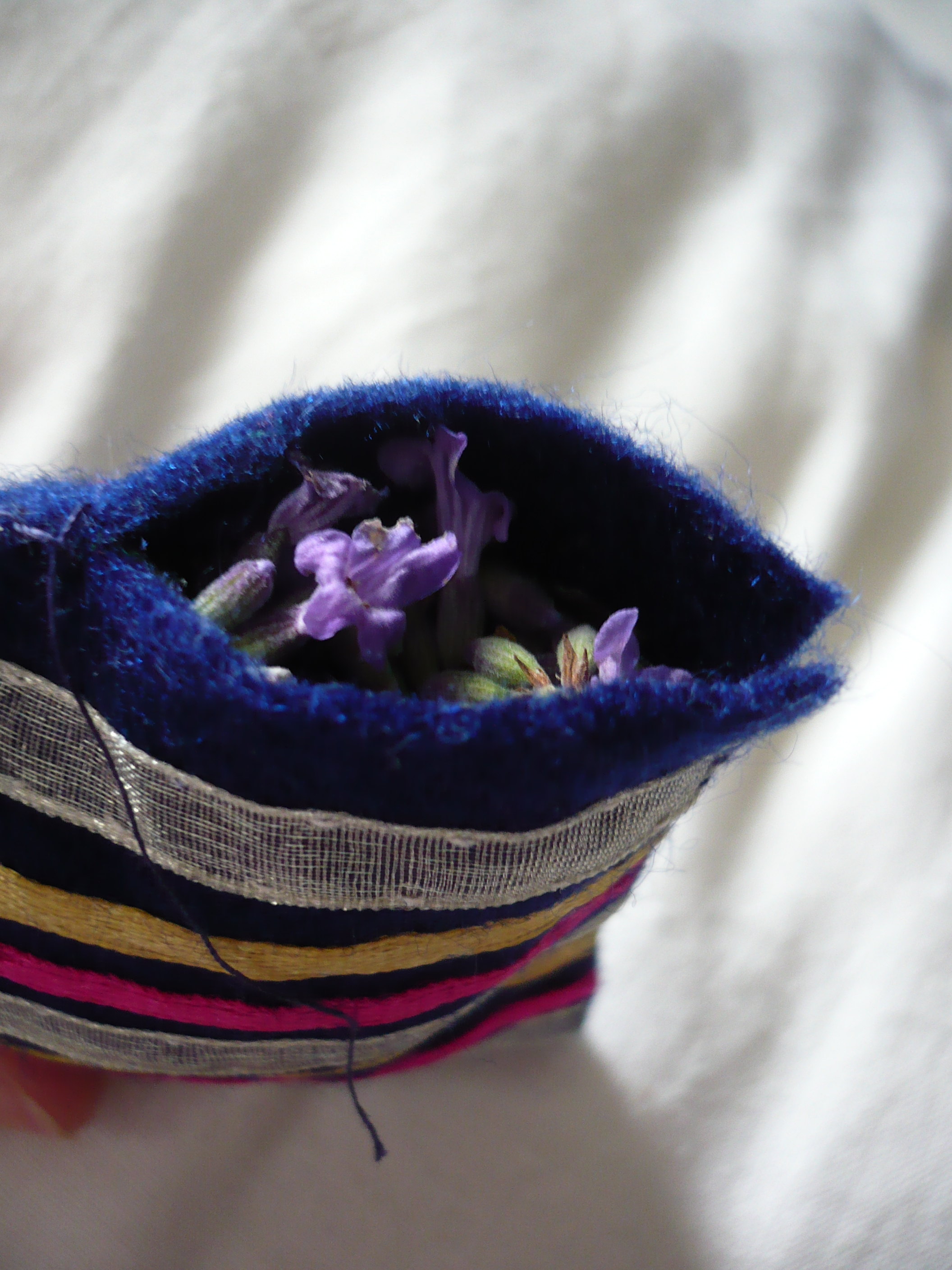

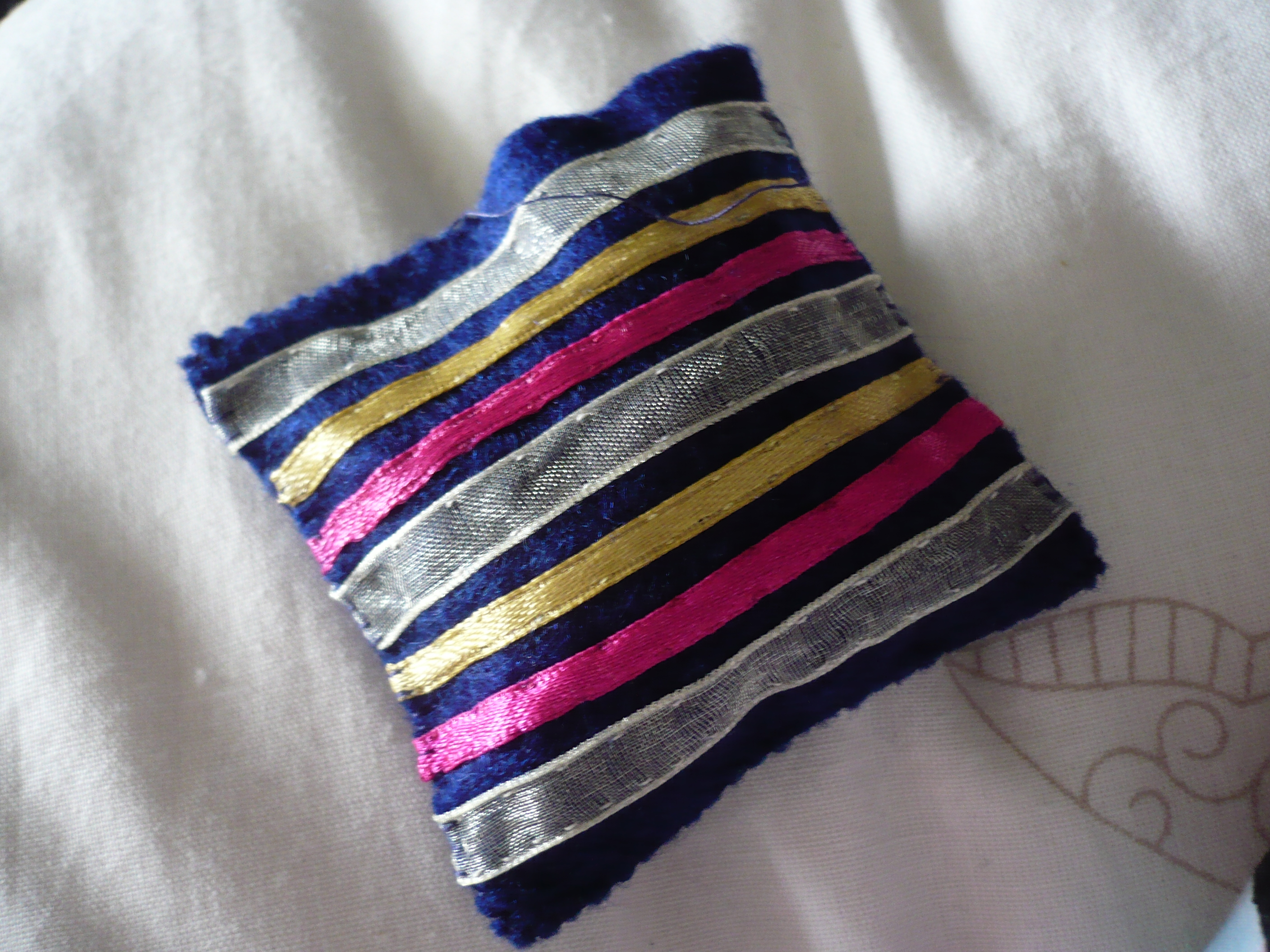

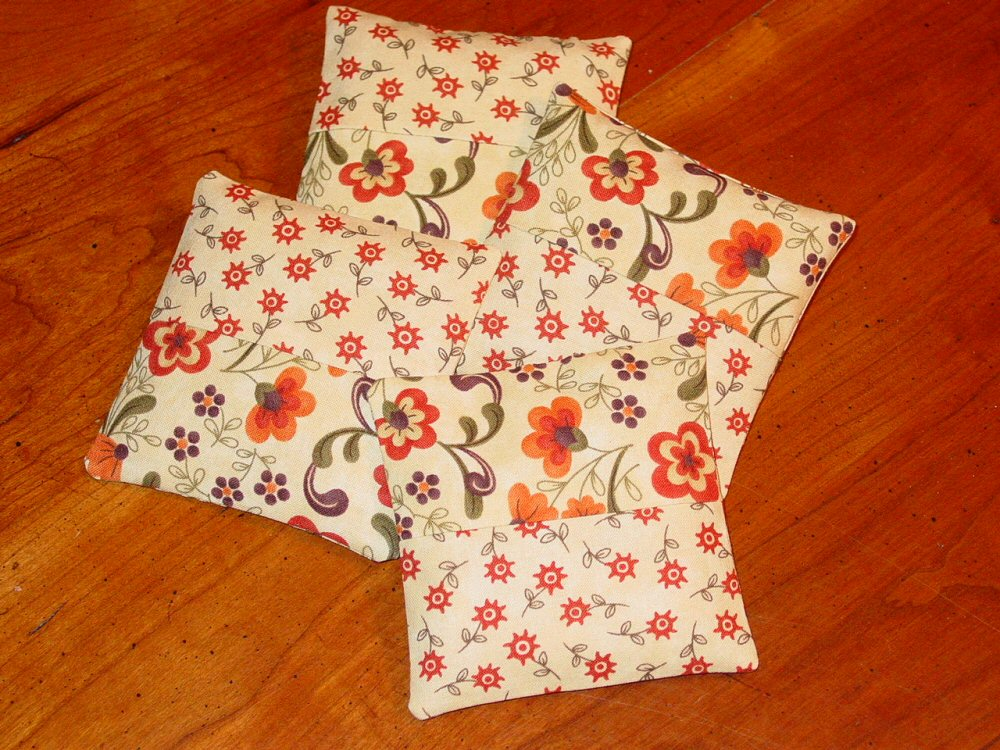

== Sources ==
- Black, Penny, The book of potpourri: fragrant flower mixes for scenting & decorating the home, Simon and Schuster, 1989, ISBN 0-671-68210-5
- Bond, Annie B., Home Enlightenment: Practical, Earth-Friendly Advice for Creating a Nurturing, Healthy, and Toxin-Free Home and Lifestyle, Rodale, 2005, ISBN 1-57954-811-3
- Booth, Nancy M., Perfumes, splashes & colognes: discovering & crafting your personal fragrances, Storey Publishing, 1997, ISBN 0-88266-985-0
- Buchanan, Rita, Taylor's guide to herbs, Houghton Mifflin, 1995, ISBN 0-395-68081-6
- BUREAU OF AMERICAN ETHNOLOGY, published 1930
- Calbom, Cherie, The Juice Lady's Guide to Juicing for Health, Avery, 2000, ISBN 0-89529-999-2
- Chopra, Deepak, A sachet of hops is traditionally placed under a child's pillow to deliver sleep-inducing aromatherapy., Random House, Inc., 2000, ISBN 0-609-80390-5
- Cox, Janice, Natural beauty from the garden: more than 200 do-it-yourself beauty recipes and garden ideas, Macmillan, 1999, ISBN 0-8050-5781-1
- Duff, Gail, Natural Fragrances: Outdoor Scents for Indoor Uses, Storey Publishing, LLC, 1991, ISBN 0-88266-683-5
- Fettner, Ann Tucker, Potpourri, incense, and other fragrant concoctions, Workman Pub. Co., 1977, ISBN 0-911104-97-6
- Fleming Charles, Royal dictionary, English and French and French and English, Volume 2, Firmin-Didot and Company, 1885
- Foster, Steven, National Geographic Desk Reference to Nature's Medicine, National Geographic Books, 2008, ISBN 1-4262-0293-8
- Freeman, Sally, Ageless Natural Beauty, Barnes & Noble Publishing, 2002, ISBN 0-7607-3373-2
- Garland, Sarah, The Complete Book of Herbs and Spices, frances lincoln ltd, 2004, ISBN 0-7112-2374-2
- Gasc, Ferdinand E. A., Dictionary of the French and English languages: with more than fifteen thousand new words, meanings, etc.., H. Holt and Company, 1876
- Hemphill, Rosemary, Fragrance and flavour: the growing and use of herbs, Angus and Robertson, 1960, Pennsylvania State University
- Hills, William Henry, The Writer, Volume 6, The Writer, 1893
- Hunter, Robert, Universal dictionary of the English language: a new and original work presenting for convenient reference the orthography, pronunciation, meaning, use, origin and development of every word in the English language ..., P. F. Collier, 1897
- Knapp, Jennifer, Beauty Magic: 101 Recipes, Spells, and Secrets , Chronicle Books, 2004, ISBN 0-8118-4222-3
- Kothe, Erika B, Jewels from Heaven , iUniverse, 2004, ISBN 0-595-31718-9
- Lust, John, The Natural Remedy Bible, Simon and Schuster, 2003, ISBN 0-7434-6642-X
- Mitrea, MD (Eur), ND Liliana Stadler, Natural medicine mosaic, Natural Medicine Books, 2007, ISBN 0-9784947-0-9
- Murphy-Hiscock, Arin, The way of the green witch: rituals, spells, and practices to bring you back to nature, Adams Media, 2006, ISBN 1-59337-500-X
- Oster, Maggie, Ortho's all about herbs, Meredith Books, 1999, ISBN 0-89721-420-X
- Pereira, Jonathan, Title The Elements of Materia Medica and Therapeutics: including notices of most of the medical substandces in use in the civilized world, and forming an Encyclopaedia of Materia Medica, Volume 1, Longman, 1854
- Rohde, Eleanour Sinclair, Rose Recipes from Olden Times, Courier Dover Publications, 1973, ISBN 0-486-22957-2
- Rose, Jeanne, Herbs & Things: Jeanne Rose's Herbal, Last Gasp, 2002, ISBN 0-86719-525-8
- Seton, Susannah, Simple Pleasures of the Home: Comforts and Crafts for Living Well, Conari, 2002, ISBN 1-57324-854-1
- Simmonds, Peter Lund, The dictionary of trade products, manufacturing, and technical terms: with a definition of the moneys, weights, and measures of all countries, G. Routledge, 1858
- Sisko, Eileen, Nature power then and now, Mason County Historical Society, 1984, ISBN 0-911377-07-7
- Strobell, Adah Parker, Like it was: Bicentennial games 'n fun handbook, Acropolis Books, 1975, ISBN 0-87491-059-5
- Sweringen, Hiram V., A dictionary of pharmaceutical science: a guide for the pharmaceutist, druggist, and physician..., P. Blakiston, 1882
- Walter, John T., hints & pinches, Hill Street Press, 2002, ISBN 1-892514-98-2
- Webster, Helen, Herbs – How to Grow Them and How to Use Them, READ BOOKS, 2008, ISBN 1-4437-3632-5
- White, Susan, Herbs Teach Yourself Book, NTC Pub. Group, 1993, ISBN 0-8442-3928-3
- Williamson, Karen, Sleep Deep: Simple Techniques for Beating Insomnia, Perigee, 2007, ISBN 0-399-53323-0
