= Gradan =

Customary Scottish method of drying grain

Gradan was an expeditious Scottish method of drying grain for the quern, by burning the straw. This term was sometimes anglicised as graddan, graddin or greddin, or Graydon meal for the resulting product. It was corn or meal prepared after the ancient custom of the Gael. A woman sitting down, took a handful of corn and holding it in her left hand by the stalks, she set fire to the ears, which were at once in a flame. In her right hand she held a stick, which she very dexterously beat the grain out the very instant the husks were quite burnt. By this simple process, corn may be cut down, winnowed, ground, dried, and baked within half an hour. In separating the meal from the husks, instead of stoves, they made use of a sheepskin, stretched on a hoop, minutely perforated by a small hot iron. The bread which is made is considered very salubrious, and was extremely pleasant to the palate of the Gael.

Another method, almost the same, used in Uist was when the grain end of the sheaf was put into the flame of the fire, and when the chaff and ends of the straw were well alight, the sheaf is held over a clean-swept part of the hearth, or over some vessel, when the grain drops off.

The term "gradan" was also used for snuff.

- (Gradan)
