= Zhengzuo =

Traditional Chinese sitting posture

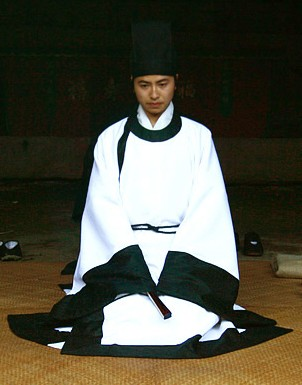
Zhengzuo figure wearing Hanfu Panling Lanshan

Zhengzuo(Chinese: 正坐; lit. 'proper sitting') is a traditional floor‑seated posture in China, also known as “Guizuo (kneeling sitting).” The standard posture is kneeling with both knees on the ground, and feet extended or crossed beneath the hips, sit with the buttocks resting on the heels, and keep the upper body upright.

After the Song dynasty, zhengzuo gradually disappeared from daily life in China and became restricted to specific sacrificial or ceremonial contexts. However, its theory and form influenced the East Asian cultural sphere and were preserved as the origin of Japan's seiza and the traditional seated postures of Korea and Vietnam.

== Etymology and terminology ==
In Classical Chinese, Zuo (坐) is similar to but distinct from “gui (跪).” Shuowen Jiezi states: “Zuo, to stop.” It refers to placing both knees on the ground and sitting with the buttocks on the heels. If the upper body is upright without touching the heels, that is gui.

For Ji (跽), If the buttocks are lifted and the upper body held straight, this is called “ji” in ancient terminology, typically used to prepare to stand or present one’s opinion during formal occasions.

Zhengzuo refers to a correct, ritual‑compliant kneeling posture. Its opposite is jiju (箕踞), sitting with both legs stretched forward. It resembles an upturned winnowing basket and considered extremely rude in antiquity.

== History ==
The tradition of zhengzuo in China can be traced back at least to the Shang dynasty. Jade figurines unearthed from the Tomb of Lady Fu Hao depict this posture, and oracle‑bone inscriptions contain several characters clearly showing the kneeling‑sitting form.

卩

光

見

即

卿

From the pre‑Qin period to the Tang dynasty, the primary seating furniture in ancient China was the floor mat. Whether in daily life or in formal occasions such as weddings and funerals, people sat on mats. Because crotched trousers (kun, written as “褌” in Chinese) were not used before the Tang dynasty, people wore open‑crotch wan (also called shin‑garments) beneath their skirts. To prevent exposing the body in an improper manner, zhengzuo became the most natural and ritually appropriate posture. In formal contexts, sitting with legs spread open, such as sitting cross‑legged or jiju, was regarded as improper. But in more casual situations, such as during meals, sitting cross‑legged was socially acceptable.

After the Upheaval of the Five Barbarians, large numbers of nomadic peoples entered the Central Plains, bringing with them Hu‑style furniture such as folding stools and high seats. Sitting on chairs became known as Hu-zuo (胡坐). Yet even by the Tang dynasty, zhengzuo remained the standard posture in formal contexts. By the Song dynasty, chairs became widespread among common people. Hu-zuo gradually became mainstream, and the structure of Chinese houses changed significantly as a result.

== International influence ==
=== Japan ===
During the Asuka and Nara periods, Japan adopted Sui‑Tang ritual systems through envoys and introduced kneeling sitting into elite society. After institutional refinement in the Edo period, it evolved into modern seiza. It is now required in tea ceremony and martial arts.

=== Korean Peninsula and Vietnam ===
Both regions were influenced by Chinese ritual culture. On the Korean Peninsula, the ondol (heated floor) system combined with kneeling sitting to form Korean floor‑living customs, though male and female postures differ from ancient Chinese forms.
