= Dhenki =

Old style rice mill or husk lever

Dhikki
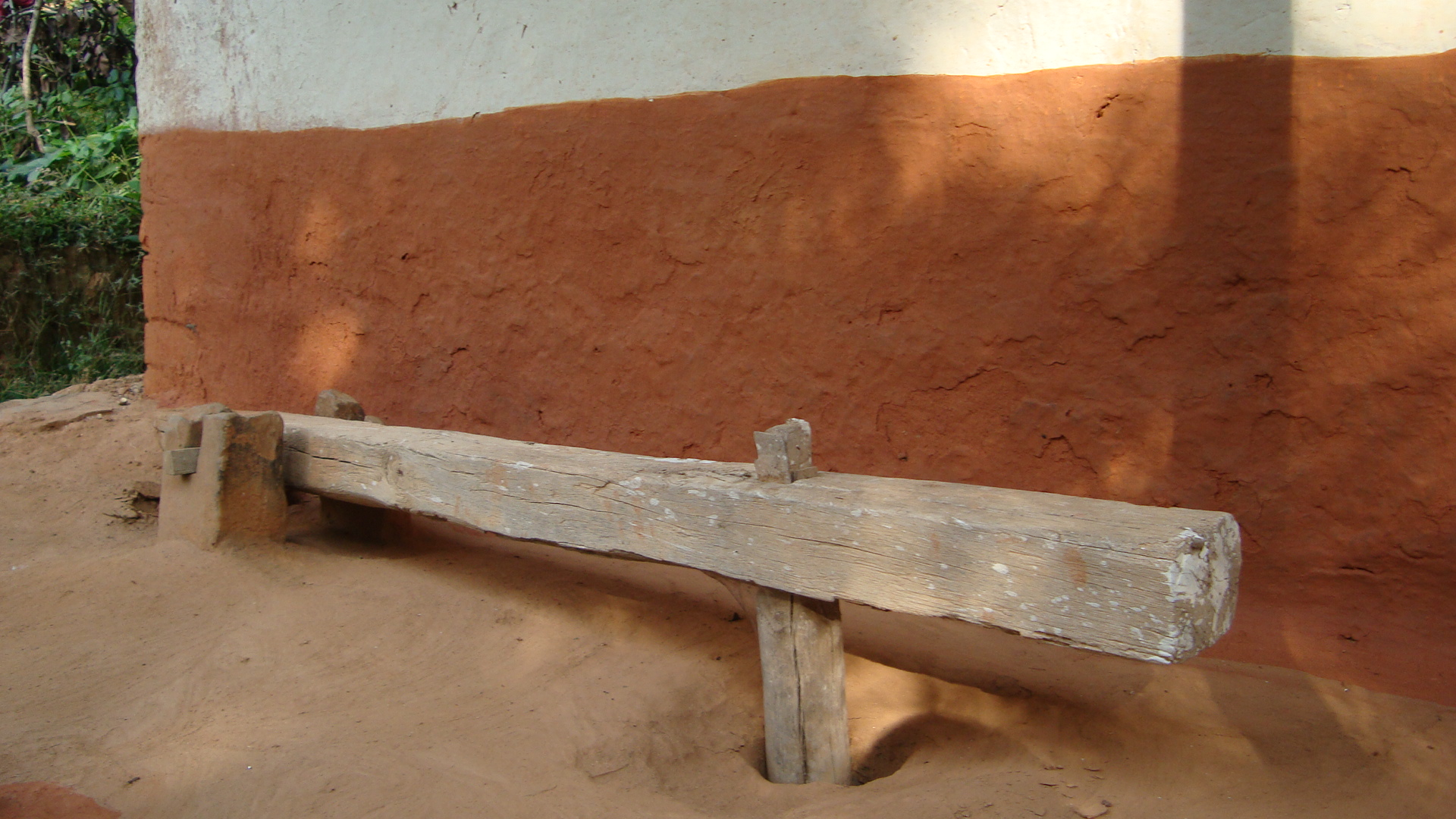
- Traditional Dhiki in Nepal
- Classification: Simple Machine
- Industry: Substantial
- Weight: Approx. 6.8 Kg
- Powered: Manual
- Components: Wood, Stone, Metal

Dhenki, Dhiki, Dhinki (Nepali: ढिकी; pronounced [ɖʱiki]), dheki or dhenki (Bangla: ঢেঁকি, Assamese: ঢেঁকী, Hindi: ढेंकि) is an old style rice mill or husk lever found in Nepal, Bangladesh and Indian states of Assam, West Bengal and Odisha. It is usually made of hard wood. It has a fulcrum supporting a weight. Due to the force of the weight upon the rice in the pods, the rice and the golden brown husks separate. Dhenki used to be operated by women to produce rice from paddy and grind rice to powder.

This agricultural tool is used for threshing, to separate rice grains from their outer husks, while leaving the bran layer, thus producing brown rice. Dhekis have generally fallen into disuse because of the availability of technologies such as combine harvesters that require much less physical labour. In earlier times a dheki was an important part of rural life in Bangladesh and in parts of India, notably West Bengal and Assam. It was generally operated by two or three women.

== Construction ==
Dhenki is traditionally made of wood and some iron. Carpenters build most parts of it where a blacksmith would attach an iron ring to the tip of the lever. A dheki consists of a heavy wooden lever, usually about 72 in (1.8 m) long, supported on a pedestal about 18 in (46 cm) high, which provides a fulcrum. At one end of the lever is a vertical wooden cylinder which functions as a pestle. It is raised by the lever, and that falls down by its own weight. The fulcrum of the lever is placed at five-eighths of the length of the lever from the pestle.

== Uses ==
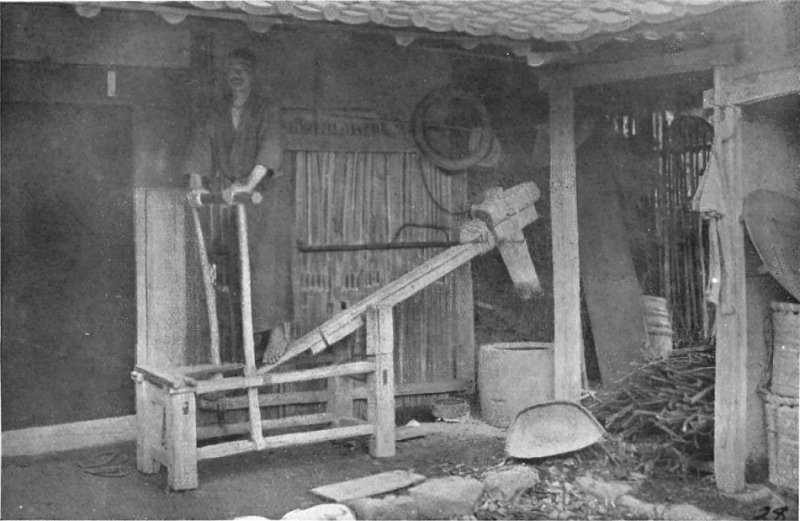
A Japanese karausu in 1920

The Assamese farming society uses it to retrieve rice from raw paddy grain, to make dry rice flakes, rice powder later to process it to make various delicious dry food items called pithas. Dhenki is also used in parts of rural Bengal and features in various Bengali idioms. Dhenki is still in use some part of rural Odisha.

In medieval times, dhenki were introduced to Japan, where they are called karausu (唐臼, lit. 'Chinese mortar').

== In popular culture ==
In the Satyajit Ray's Bengali movie Ashani Sanket, the actresses were seen operating dhenki for a short period of time. Odia author Fakir Mohan Senapati has mentioned of dhenki in his literary works.

A woman grinding rice with Dhinki in a village in Odisha

== See also ==
- Mortar and pestle
- Rice pounder
