= Rice hull =

Protective husk of rice grains

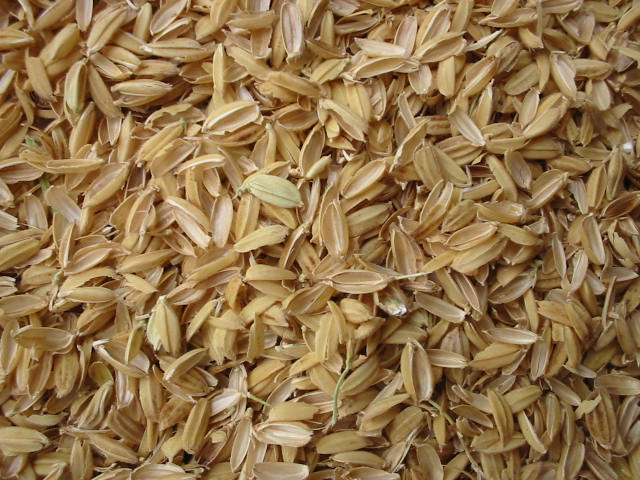
Rice husk

Rice hulls or husks are the hard protecting coverings of grains of rice. In addition to protecting rice during the growing season, rice hulls can be put to use as building material, fertilizer, insulation material, or fuel. Rice hulls are part of the chaff of the rice.

== Production ==
Rice hulls are part of the rice seed. The hull protects the grain during the growing season from pests. The hull is formed from hard materials, including opaline silica and lignin. The hull is hard to eat or swallow (unless finely ground) and mostly indigestible to humans because of its enriched fibre components. However, during times of food scarcity in ancient China, a common daily meal was a pastry made from rice husks, wild vegetables, and soybean powder. This led to the idiom "meals of cereal, hulls, and vegetables for half a year", indicating poverty and food insecurity. Testing and commercialization of human grade anti-caking agents were done in the early 2000s. The material is approved for use in USDA Certified Organic products to replace silicon dioxide.

Winnowing, used to separate the rice from hulls, consists of putting the whole rice into a pan and throwing it into the air while the wind blows. The light hulls are blown away while the heavy rice falls back into the pan. Later, pestles and a simple machine called a rice pounder were developed to remove hulls. In 1885 the modern rice hulling machine was invented in Brazil. During the milling processes, the hulls are removed from the raw grain to reveal whole brown rice, which is then usually milled further to remove the bran layer, resulting in white rice.

== Uses ==
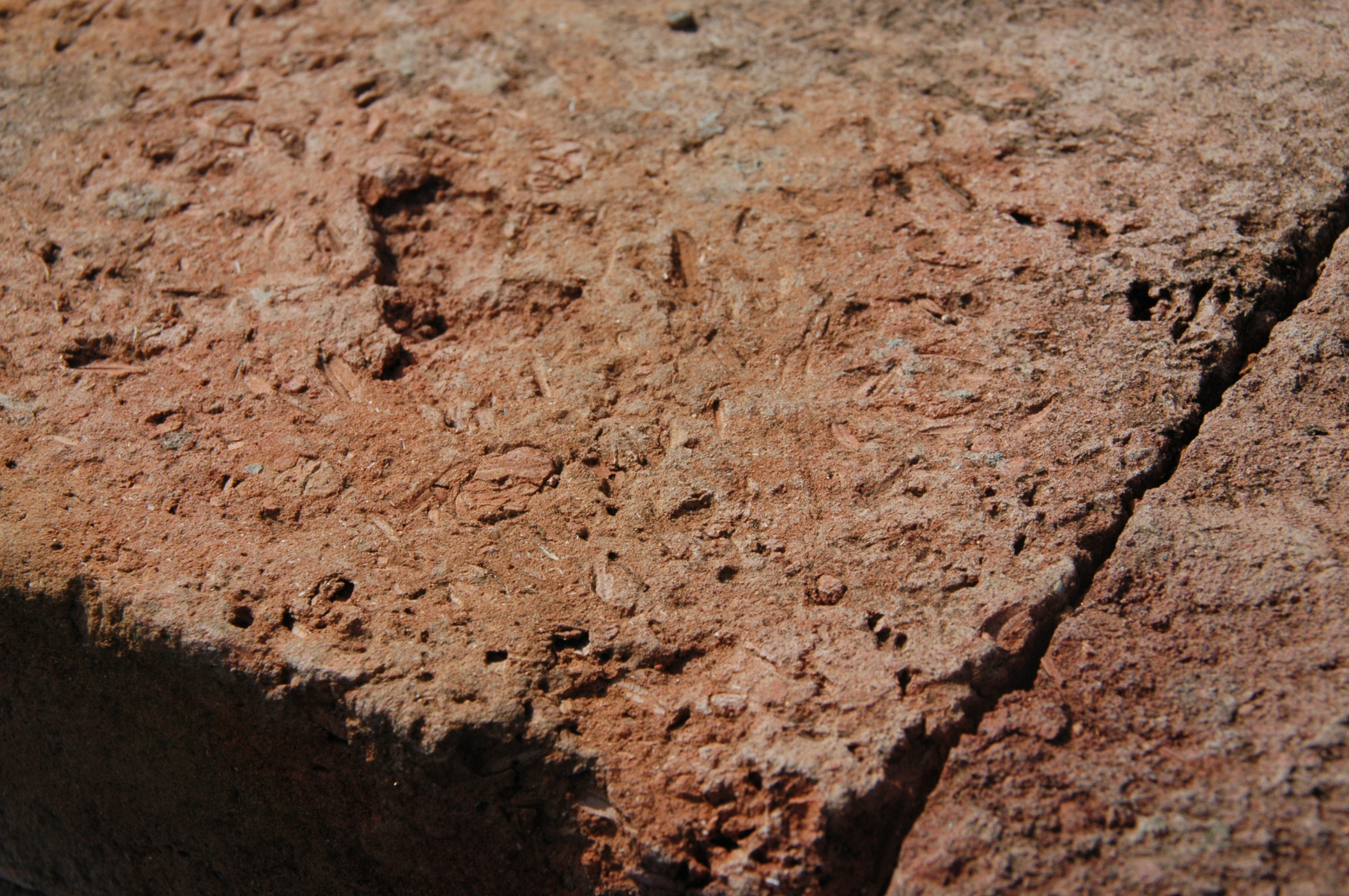
The temples of the Batujaya Archaeological Site in Indonesia (5th century CE) were built with bricks containing rice hulls.

=== Ash ===
Most of the rice hulls are burned after the rice grain is extracted, producing pollution. If it is composted, it produces methane gas.

Combustion of rice hulls affords rice husk ash (RHA). This ash is a potential source of amorphous reactive silica, which has a variety of applications in materials science. Most of the ash is used in the production of Portland cement. When burnt completely, the ash can have a Blaine number of as much as 3,600 compared to the Blaine number of cement (between 2,800 and 3,000), meaning it is finer than cement. Silica is the basic component of sand, which is used with cement for plastering and concreting. This fine silica will provide a very compact concrete. The ash also is a very good thermal insulation material. The fineness of the ash also makes it a very good candidate for sealing fine cracks in civil structures, where it can penetrate deeper than the conventional cement sand mixture.

Rice husk ash has long been used in ceramic glazes in rice-growing regions in the Far East, such as China and Japan. Being about 95% silica, it is an easy way of introducing the necessary silica into the glaze, and the small particle size helps with early melting of the glaze.

Possible uses for RHA include absorbents for oils and chemicals, soil ameliorants, a source of silicon, insulation powder in steel mills, repellents in the form of "vinegar-tar" release agent in the ceramics industry, and as an insulation material. More specialized applications include use as a catalyst support.

Goodyear announced plans to use rice husk ash as a source for tire additive.

Rice hulls are a low-cost material from which silicon carbide "whiskers" can be manufactured. The SiC whiskers are then used to reinforce ceramic cutting tools, increasing their strength tenfold.

=== Tooth powder ===
In southern India, charred rice hull, known as umikkari in Malayalam and Tamil, was traditionally used for cleaning teeth before the advent of toothpaste.

=== Rice bran oil ===
Rice bran oil is the oil extracted from the hard outer brown layer of rice called chaff (rice husk). It is popular as a cooking oil in the Indian subcontinent and East Asian countries, including India, Nepal, Bangladesh, Indonesia, Japan, Southern China, and Malaysia.

=== Brewing ===
Rice hulls can be used in brewing beer to increase the lautering ability of a mash. Rice husk is also used in one step of traditional preparation processes of kaoliang (sorghum) liquid. After fermentation, rice husk can be added into the wine tank to increase the void, which is advantageous for distillation.

=== Fertilizer and substrate ===
Rice hulls can be composted, but their high lignin content can make this a slow process. Sometimes earthworms are used to accelerate the process. Using vermicomposting techniques, hulls can be converted to fertilizer in about four months.

Rice hulls that are parboiled (PBH) are used as a substrate or medium for gardening, including certain hydrocultures. The hulls decay over time. Rice hulls allow drainage, and retain less water than growstones. It has been shown that rice hulls do not affect plant growth regulation.

=== Fireworks ===
Rice hulls are coated with fine-grained gunpowder and used as the main bursting charge in aerial fireworks shells.

=== Fuel ===
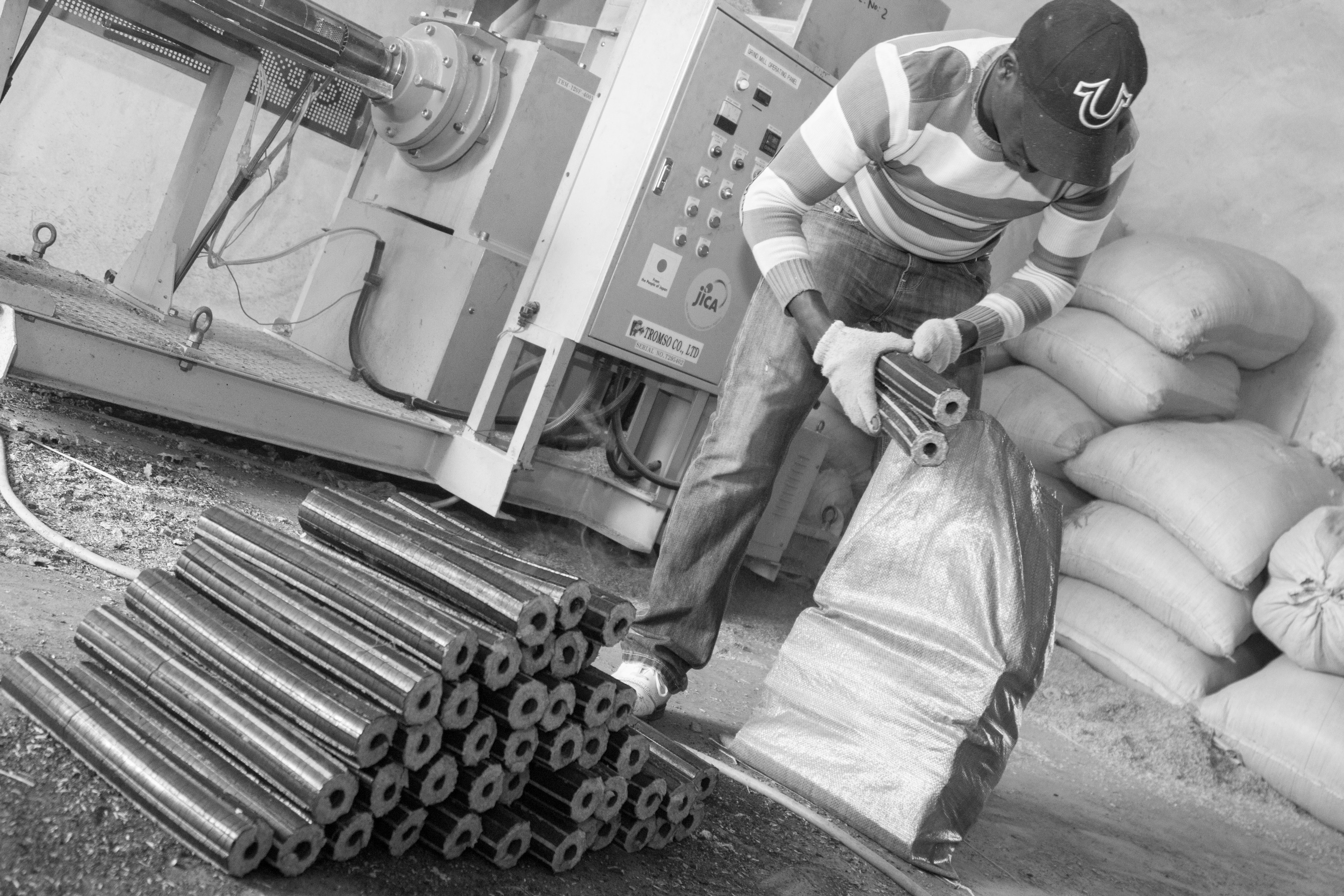
Rice hulls can be pressed into logs for use in cooking fires instead of wood.

Rice chaff being put to a brickmaking kiln in Mekong delta.

With proper techniques, rice hulls can be burned and used to power steam engines. Some rice mills originally disposed of hulls in this way.

The direct combustion of rice hulls produces large quantities of smoke. An alternative is gasification. Rice hulls are easily gasified in top-lit updraft gasifiers. The combustion of this rice hull gas produces a blue flame, and rice hull biochar makes a good soil amendment.

Traditional brickmaking kilns in Mekong Delta are using rice hulls as fuel.

=== Juice extraction ===
Rice hulls are used as a "press aid" to improve extraction efficiency of apple pressing.

=== Pet food fiber ===
Rice hulls are an inexpensive byproduct of human food processing, serving as a source of fiber that is considered a filler ingredient in pet foods.

=== Pillow stuffing ===
Rice hulls are used as pillow stuffing. The pillows are loosely stuffed and considered therapeutic as they retain the shape of the head.

=== Insulating material ===
Rice hulls themselves are a class A thermal insulating material because they are difficult to burn and less likely to allow moisture to propagate mold or fungi. It is also used as roofing after mixing it with mud and water.

=== Particle boards and cardboard ===
Rice hulls are used to make particle boards and cardboard. The silica in rice husk make the particle boards less attractive to termites and fire retardant.

=== Geopolymers ===
Due to high amorphous silica content, the RHA (rice husk ash) can be used as a precursor material for geopolymer concrete.

=== Rice concrete ===
Rice hulls are also used as an additive to cement, or as an alternative to it.

To achieve the best pozzolanic properties the combustion of the husks has to be carefully controlled by keeping the temperature below 700 °C (973 K) and to create conditions to minimize carbon formation by feeding sufficient air.

At a given water-cement ratio, the addition of small amounts of rice hull ash (2 to 3% of cement mass) may be useful to improve the workability of concrete mixtures by reducing the cement milk separation and segregation and increasing the strength and durability of concrete. However, the introduction of large quantities of this additive may result in poor workability of the concrete mixture if strong water-reducing additives are not used.

== See also ==
- Rice-hull bagwall construction
- Winnowing barn

== Bibliography ==
- Ma, Jian Feng; Kazunori Tamai; Naoki Yamaji; et al. (2006). "A silicon transporter in rice". Nature. 440 (7084): 688–691. Bibcode:2006Natur.440..688M. doi:10.1038/nature04590. PMID 16572174. S2CID 4330847.
- Mitani, Namiki; Jian Feng Ma; Takashi Iwashita (2005). "Identification of the silicon form in xylem sap of rice (Oryza sativa L.)". Plant Cell Physiol. 46 (2): 279–283. doi:10.1093/pcp/pci018. PMID 15695469.
- Mitani, Namiki; Jian Feng Ma (2005). "Uptake system of silicon in different plant species". J. Exp. Bot. 56 (414): 1255–1261. doi:10.1093/jxb/eri121. PMID 15753109.
