= Fengshanche =

Winnowing machine used in ancient China

Fengshanche (Chinese: 風扇車; pinyin: fēngshànchē; lit. 'wind fan vehicle') was a winnowing machine that was used in ancient China to separate the grain from the chaff or seed casings after harvest. The winnowing machine also had a rotary fan which had a blower that had a crank handle to create air to blow away the lighter seed casings to separate the husks from the pile of grain.

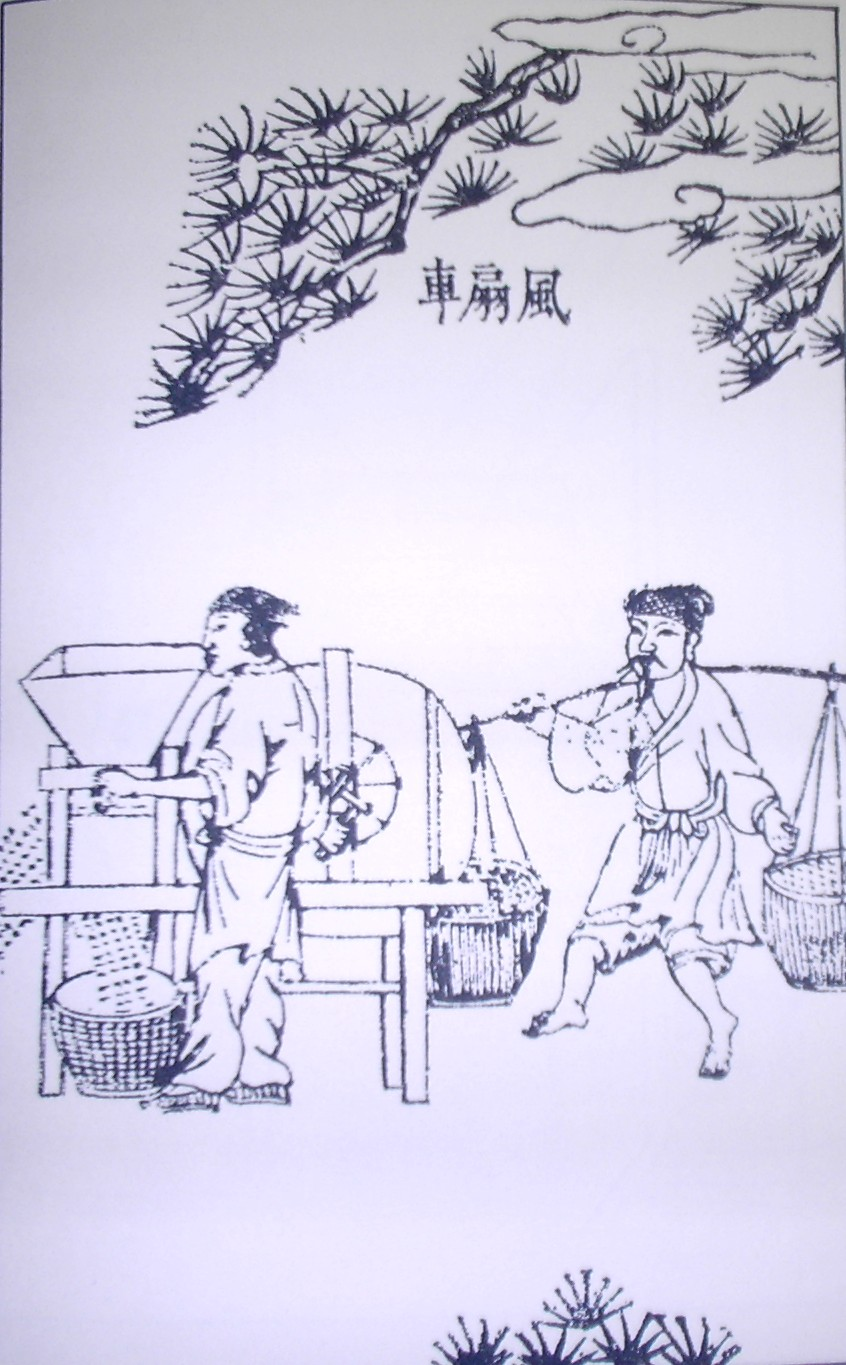
A rotary fan winnowing machine with two farm workers separating the grain from the husks as illustrated in Song Yingxing's Tiangong Kaiwu.

== Overview ==
Based on the archaeological evidence provided by pottery models of the winnowing machine, the winnowing machine was constructed within the courtyard wall that had querns and trip hammers placed near it. The machine also had a crank operated rotary fan with four blades, an air inlet, and hopper as well as a box, crank, and vanes. The device was able to be operated by hands or feet. The crank consists of four to six vanes that are made of thin boards. When operated, grains are placed in the gap through the funnel where they fall down. The vanes would then spin and then separate the lighter husks by blowing them away with the grains with no husks that would fall to box's bottom.

== History ==
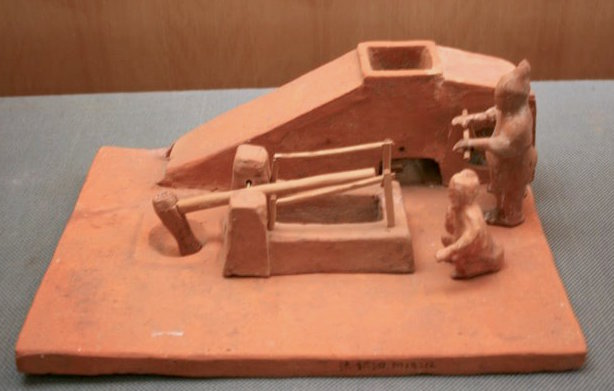
A Western Han pottery model featuring two men operating a winnowing machine with a crank handle and a tilt hammer used to pound grain.

The winnowing machine was referred and applied to grain cleaning based on the references in the book of Jijiupian during the Western Han dynasty. The pottery winnower model was used as a funeral object in the Central Plains. The ancient Chinese used their other invention of the crank handle and a rotary centrifugal fan and applied it to the design of the winnowing machine. Evidence of the rotary fan winnowing machine that makes use of the centrifugal principle can be traced back to the Western Han dynasty with archaeological evidence provided by pottery models of the winnowing machine excavated from Western Han tombs in Luoyang, Henan in the early 1970s.

== See also ==
- Agriculture in China
