= Winnowing barn =

Farming structures in South Carolina, US

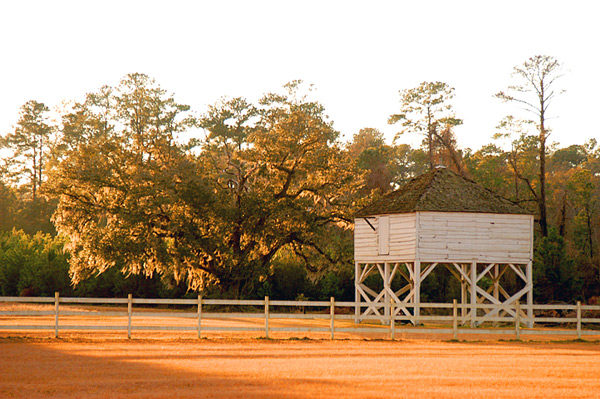
The winnowing barn at Mansfield Plantation, Georgetown, SC. The last remaining winnowing barn in Georgetown County.

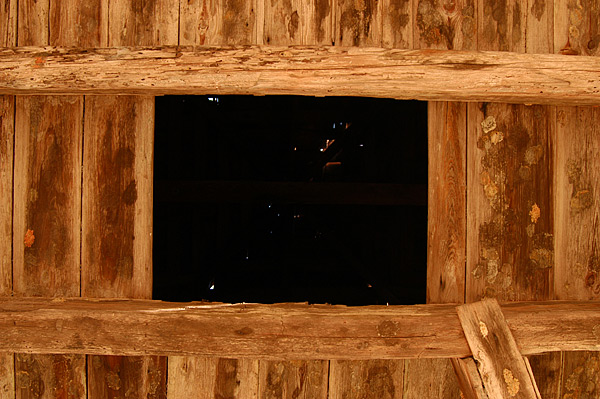
Looking up into the winnowing barn at Mansfield Plantation, Georgetown, SC

Winnowing barns (or winnowing houses) were structures commonly found in South Carolina on antebellum rice plantations. A winnowing barn consists of a large shed on tall posts with a hole in the floor. Raw, husked rice was carried up into the barn by slaves and then the grain was dropped through the hole. As the grain dropped to the ground, the lighter and undesirable chaff was carried away in the wind, leaving a mound of purified rice grains directly below the winnowing barn. The purified grain was then packed into barrels and carried down river to port cities for distribution.

Prior to the development of the winnowing barn, winnowing was done by hand using winnowing baskets — a long and labor-intensive process. Thus, the development of the winnowing barn helped South Carolina become the second largest exporter of rice in the world, next to Indonesia and the Far East.

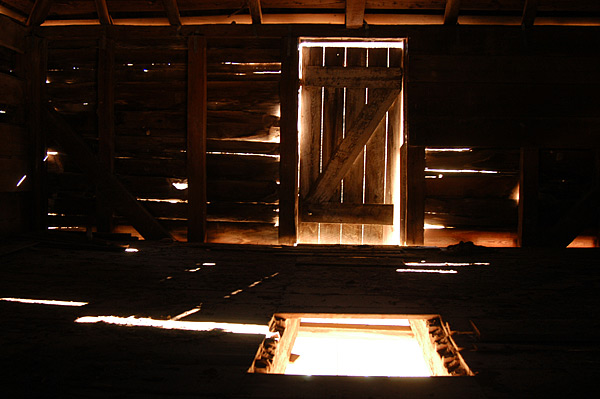
View from inside the winnowing barn at Mansfield Plantation. Note the hole in the floor where the unpurified grain was dropped

== See also ==
- Rice hulls
- Rice huller
- Rice pounder
- Rice barn
