= Winnowing basket =

Agricultural tool for preparing grains

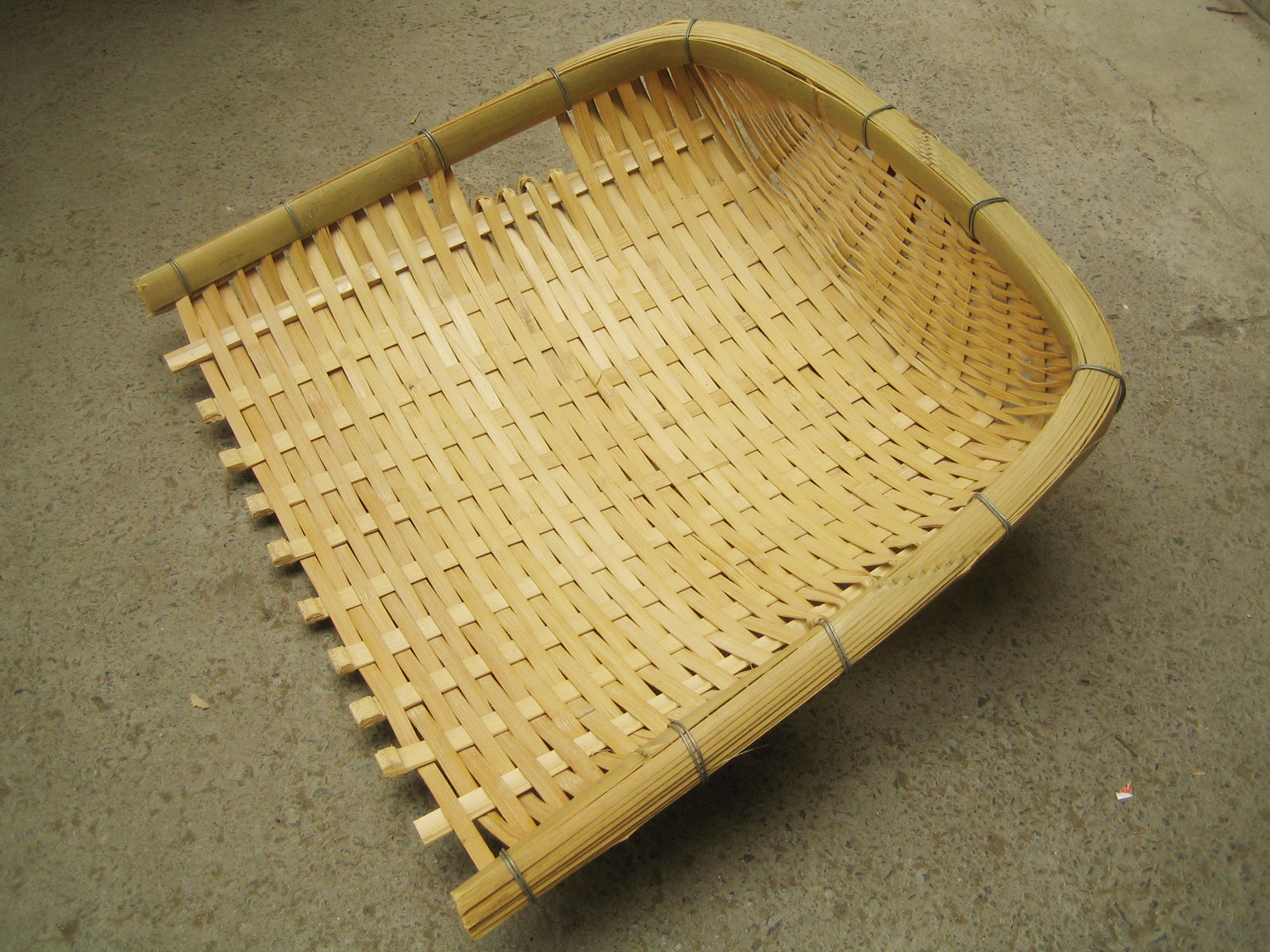
A Japanese winnowing basket (2007)

A winnowing basket or fan is a tool for winnowing grain from chaff while removing dirt and dust too. They have been used traditionally in a number of civilizations for centuries, and are still in use today in some countries.

== Use ==
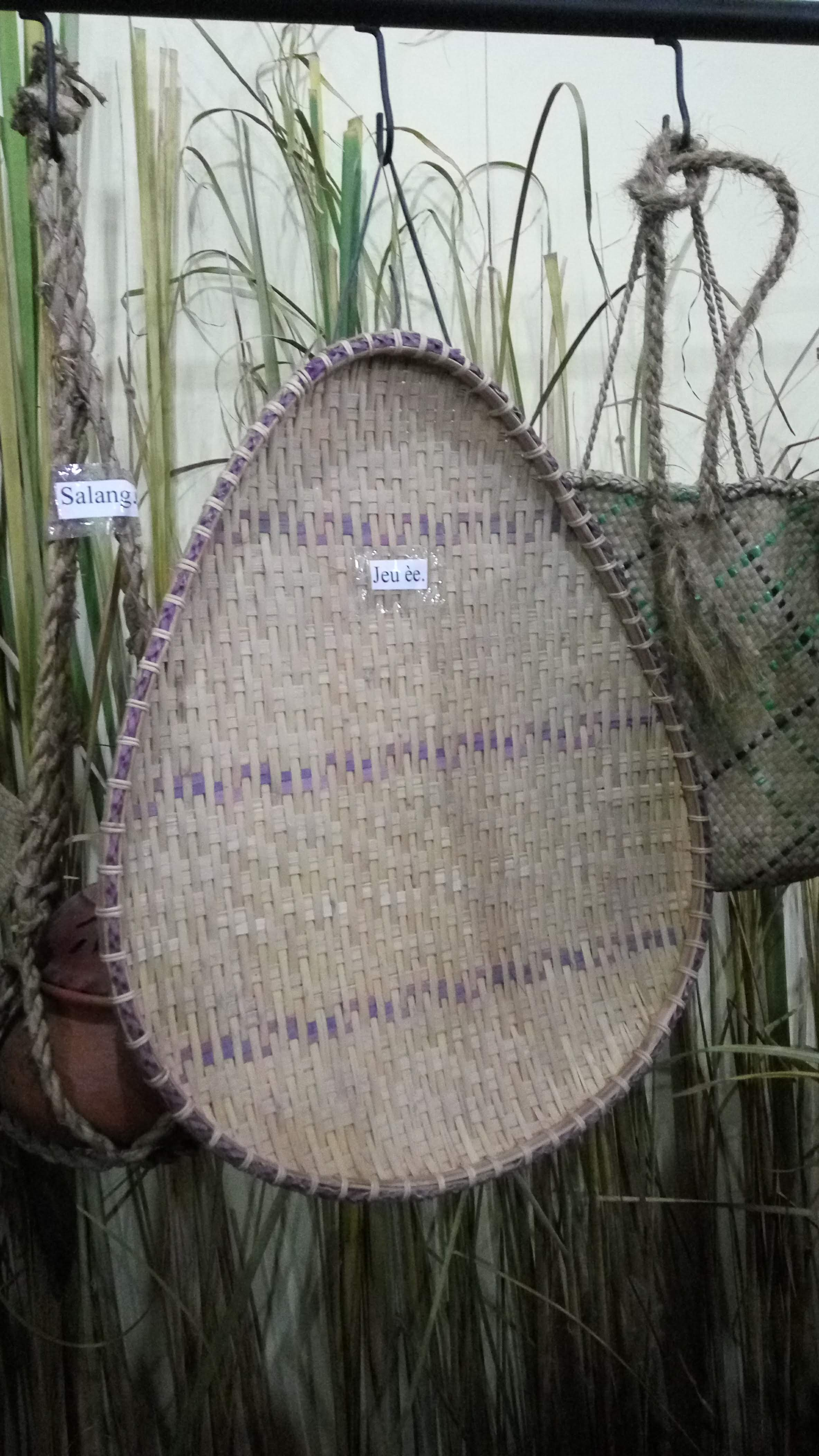
Jeuèe, winnowing basket from Aceh

Unprocessed grain, mixed with impurities like dirt or inedible husks, is placed on the basket. The basket is then lifted and shaken, which separates out lighter particles (usually inedible husks) from heavier particles (the grain). The process can benefit from mild wind, which can carry away lighter particles.

== By region ==
=== Ancient Greece ===
The λικνον (liknon) appears in the Iliad (5.4999).

=== India ===
These have been used in India from centuries and still see widespread contemporary use. They are known as soup in Hindi and kulo in Bangla. In West Bengal, Odisha, Assam, and Bihar the tool is also used to welcome the groom during marriage ceremonies.

=== Japan ===
They are known as mino or mi (箕).

=== Korea ===
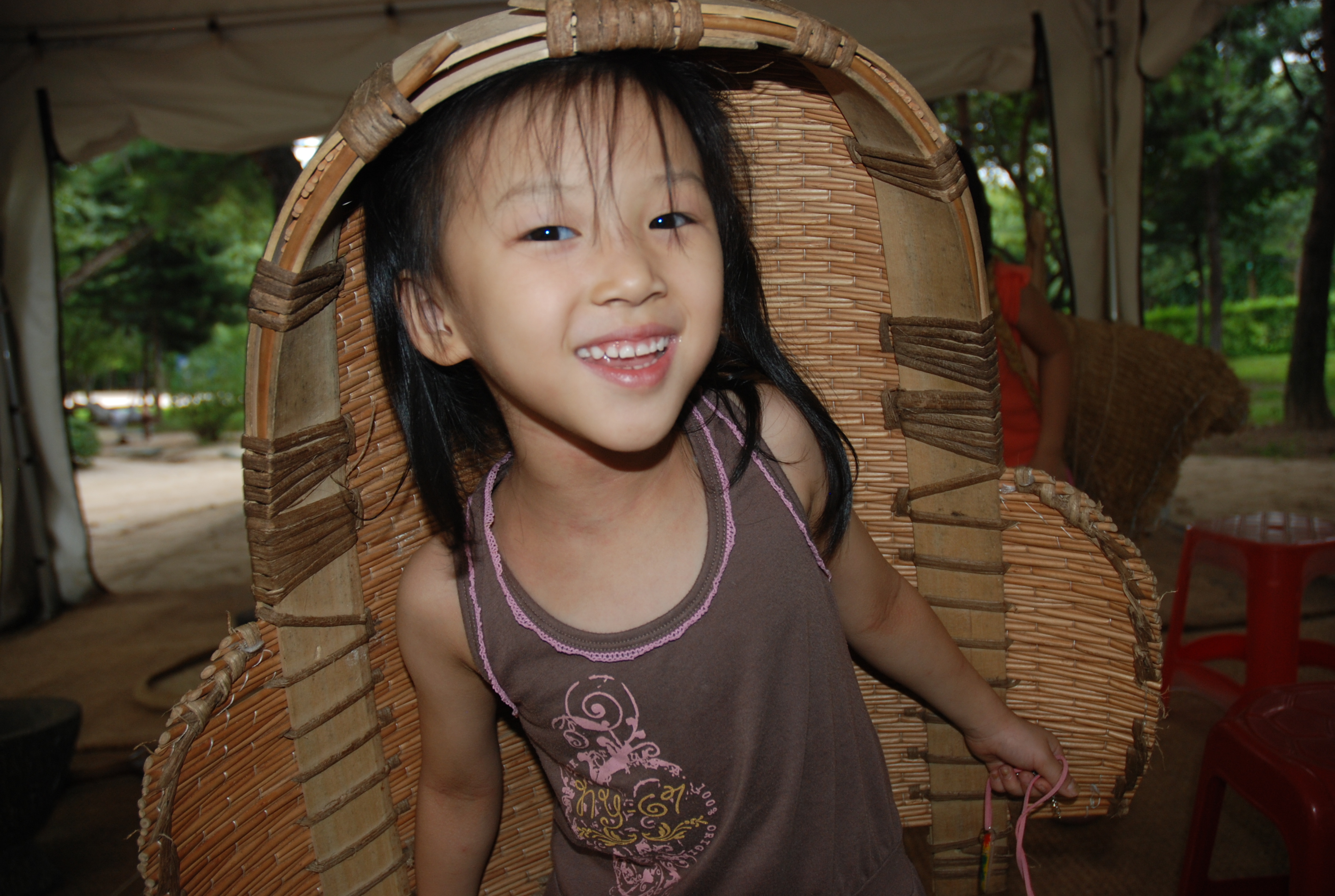
A Korean child wearing a winnowing basket on their head (2008)

These are known as k'i (Korean: 키) in Korea, and were used throughout the region for centuries. There was some regional variation in what materials the k'i were constructed from, with southern regions using primarily bamboo instead of wicker.

==== Traditions ====
There is a folk tradition where children who are unable to adequately control when they urinate (particularly while sleeping) are made to wear the k'i on their head, then sent to knock on the doors of their neighbors and ask for salt. This served to publicly embarrass the child into compliance, as neighbors would recognize why the child was knocking on their door.

In South Gyeongsang Province, there was a tradition where people avoided buying the baskets on the first market day of each lunar year, as the baskets, as they would with husks, would allow good luck to escape. A tradition on Jeju Island involved a type of divination, where on Lunar New Year's Eve, the baskets would be cleaned, washed, and placed facedown. The following morning, the baskets would be inspected. If rice was present under the basket, then the harvest would be good that year.

== See also ==
- Winnowing Oar
