= Winnowing Oar =

Object that appears in Homer's Odyssey

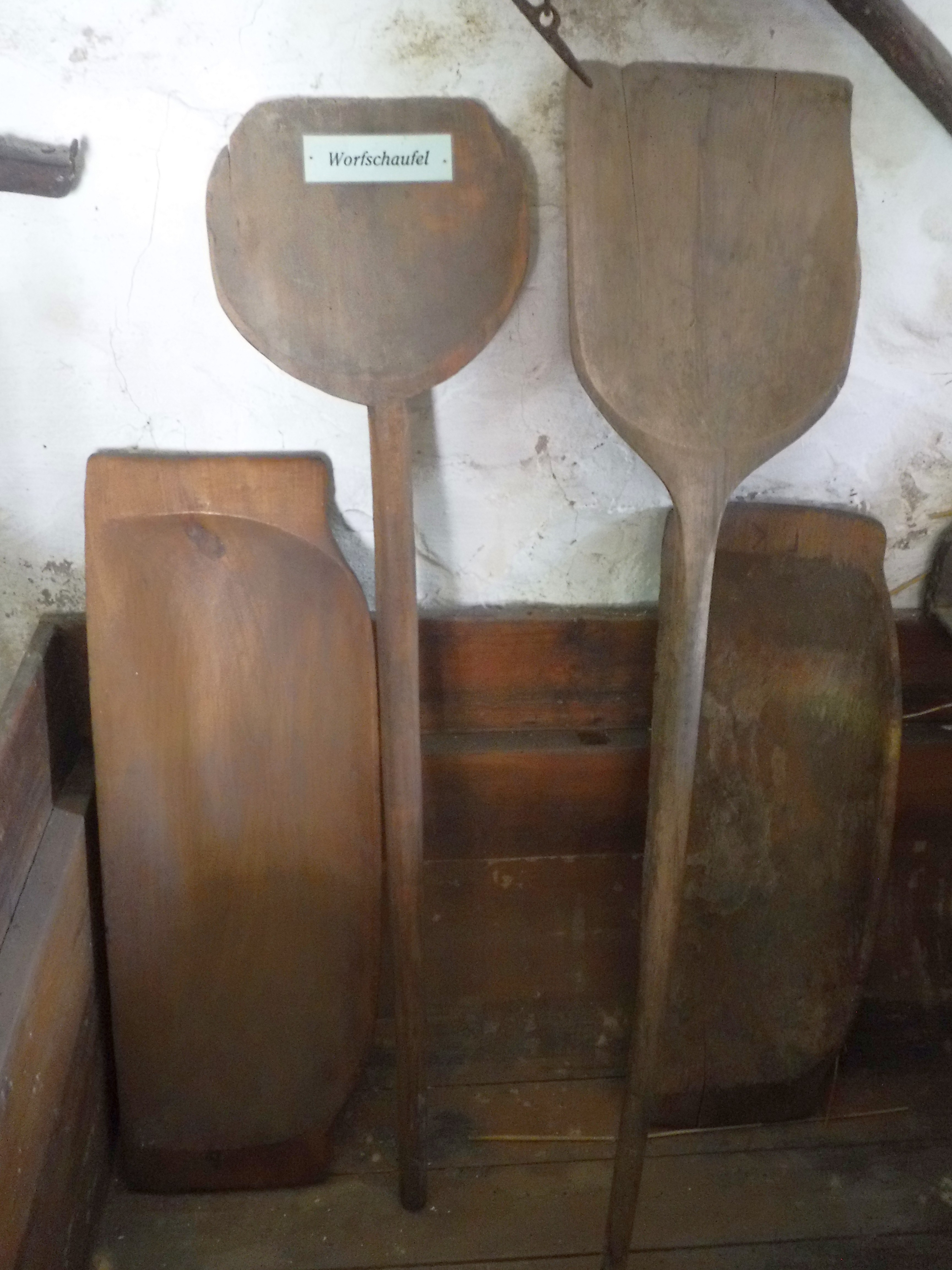
Oar-shaped winnowing shovels

The Winnowing Oar (athereloigos - Greek ἀθηρηλοιγός) is an object that appears in Books XI and XXIII of Homer's Odyssey. In the epic, Odysseus is instructed by Tiresias to take an oar from his ship and to walk inland until he finds a "land that knows nothing of the sea", where the oar would be mistaken for a winnowing shovel. At this point, he is to offer a sacrifice to Poseidon, and then at last his journeys would be over.

== In popular culture ==
- In 2003 the artist Conrad Shawcross created a work, Winnowing Oar, based on the object. Sculpted in oak, spruce and ash, it is an imaginary tool with a winnowing shovel at one end and an oar blade at the other. It formed part of the Shawcross' 2004 Continuum exhibition at the National Maritime Museum.
- The metaphor is used in the TV series Black Sails.
- The song "Marching Inland" by Tom Lewis is a modern interpretation of the concept:

I'm marching inland from the shore, over m' shoulder I'm carrying an oar,
When someone asks me: "What - is that funny thing you've got?"
Then I know I'll never go to sea no more, no more,
Then I know I'll never go to sea no more!
