= Growstones =

Growstones are a substrate for growing plants that can be used for soilless purposes or as a soil conditioner. This substrate is made from recycled glass. It has both more air and water retention space than perlite and peat. Another property of this medium is that it holds more water than parboiled rice hulls. Growstones appear to be a comparable alternative to expanded clay aggregate.

Growstones are made in a variety of sizes from a large 1 to 2 inch sized "Lift" product made to supplement drainage in potted plants while retaining superior moisture and nutrients for the plant roots, to "Gnat Nix" which is a small "5MM" size product to prevent fungus gnats from thriving in potted plants. Growstone company also produces several blended sizes of their products for specific growers' needs including sizes appropriate for green roof gardening.

Growstone ceased operations as of January 26, 2019, though warehoused product is still available. Plans for restarting production have not yet been announced.
