= Sorting (sediment) =

Distribution of grain size of sediments

Sediment consisting of well sorted grains (left) compared with poorly sorted grains (right).

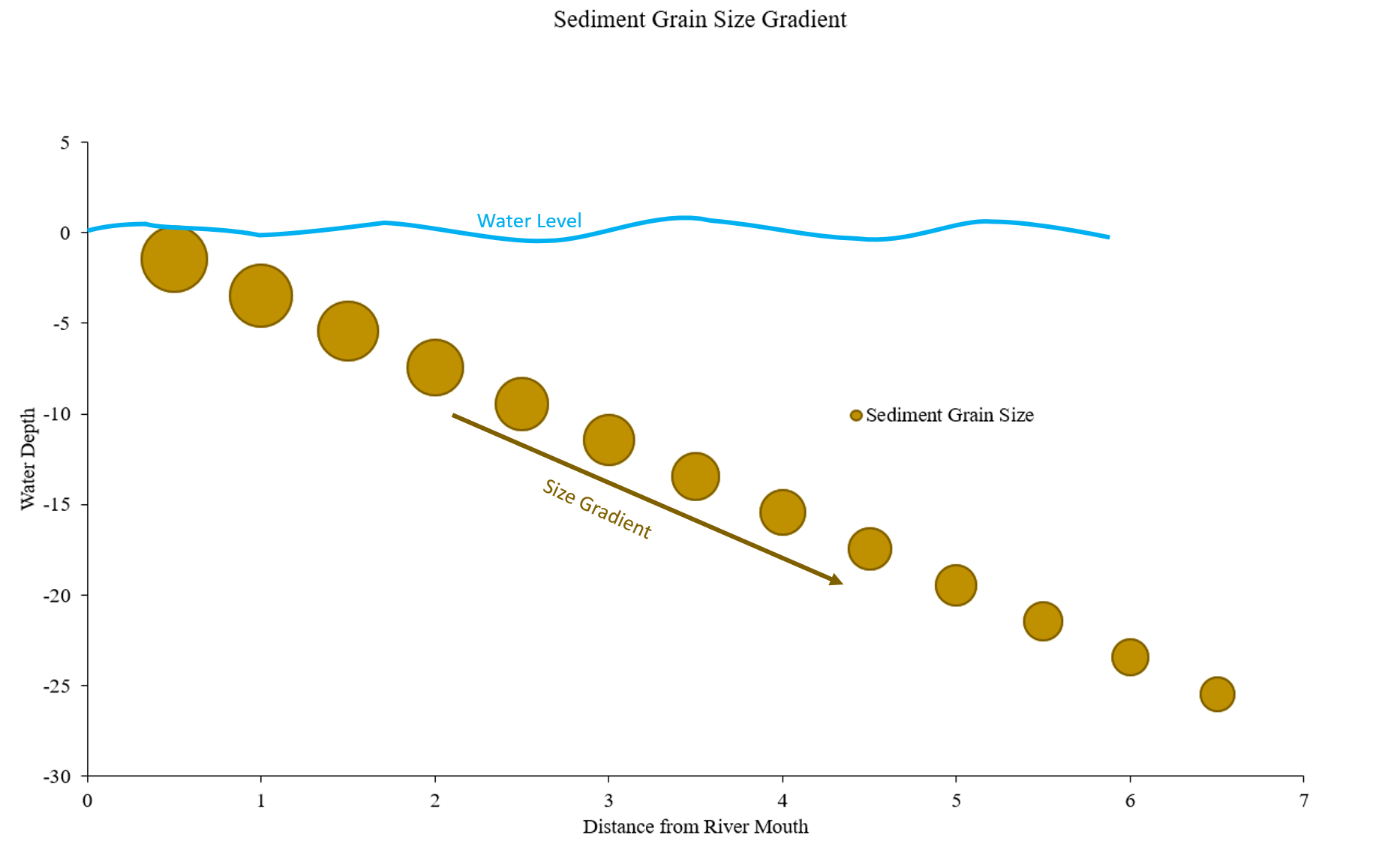
Distribution of grain sizes based on water depth and distance from river mouth.

Sorting describes the distribution of grain size of sediments, either in unconsolidated deposits or in sedimentary rocks. The degree of sorting is determined by the range of grain sizes in a sediment deposit and is the result of various transport processes (rivers, debris flow, wind, glaciers, etc.). This should not be confused with crystallite size, which refers to the individual size of a crystal in a solid. Crystallite is the building block of a grain.

== Sorting parameters ==
The terms describing sorting in sediments – very poorly sorted, poorly sorted, moderately sorted, well sorted, very well sorted – have technical definitions and semi-quantitatively describe the amount of variance seen in particle sizes.Very poorly sorted indicates that the sediment sizes are mixed (large variance); whereas well sorted indicates that the sediment sizes are similar (low variance). In the field, sedimentologists use graphical charts to accurately describe the sorting of a sediment using one of these terms.

Tangential sorting is the result of sediment being deposited in same direction as flow. Normal tangential sorting results in a gradient of sediment sizes deposited from largest to finest as they travel downstream. When sediments are deposited from smallest to largest as they travel downstream, this is referred to as reverse sorting.

Rocks derived from well sorted sediments are commonly both porous and permeable, while poorly sorted rocks have low porosity and low permeability, particularly when fine grained.

== Processes involved in sorting ==
Sediment sorting is influenced by: grain sizes of sediment, processes involved in grain transport, deposition, and post-deposition processes such as winnowing. As a result, studying the degree of sorting in deposits of sediment can give insight into the energy, rate, and/or duration of deposition, as well as the transport process responsible for laying down the sediment.

=== Aeolian processes ===
In reference to windblown sediment, a wide range of conditions such as distance and height of transport and varying wind patterns at the sediment source can affect grain size, rate of transport and distribution of sediment. Windblown sediment travels one of three ways--rolling, saltation or suspension in the air.

Loess that is reworked by fluvial processes tends to have more poorly sorted sediment as compared to sediment sorted by only Aeolian processes because loess particles become mixed with preexisting sediment of varying grain sizes within bodies of water.

== See also ==
- Graded bedding
- Rounding
- Porosity
- Soil texture
- Deposition
- Fluvial processes
- Aeolian transport
- Grain size
