= Winnowing (sedimentology) =

Natural removal of fine material from a coarser sediment

In sedimentology, winnowing is the natural removal of fine material from a coarser sediment by wind or flowing water. Once a sediment has been deposited, subsequent changes in the speed or direction of wind or water flowing over it can agitate the grains in the sediment and allow the preferential removal of the finer grains. This action can improve the sorting and increase the mean grain size of a sediment after it has been deposited.

The term winnowing is from the analogous process for the agricultural separation of wheat from chaff.
