= Rice pounder =

Simple machine to make rice flour

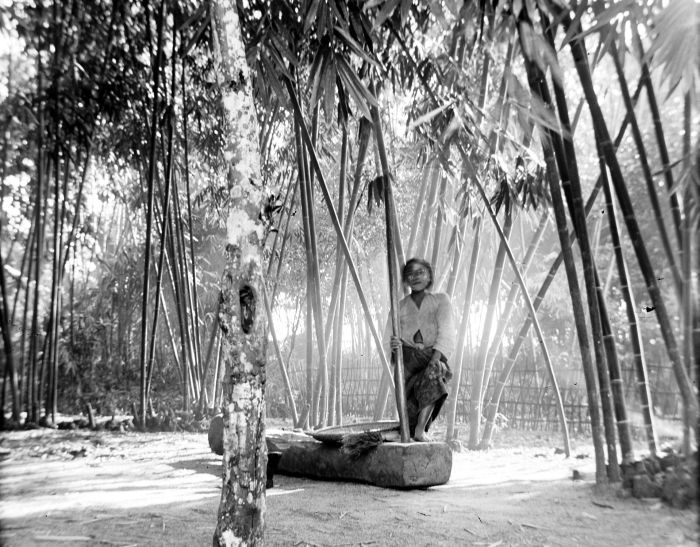
A woman pounding rice in a rice pounder in a village near Bandung, Indonesia (picture taken in 1908). This method involves dropping a large heavy, loose pestle directly on the rice.

A rice pounder is an agricultural tool, a simple machine that is commonly used in Southeast Asia to dehull rice or to turn rice into rice flour. The device has similar functionality to a mortar and pestle, but with more mechanical advantage to conserve labor. Rice is dehulled by continually raising and then dropping the heavy head or pestle of the pounder into a block or mortar.

Some rice pounders are foot-operated; the head is raised by standing on the handle of the device past its fulcrum (similar to a see-saw). Once raised, the user quickly steps off of the handle, allowing the heavy head to fall into the mortar and pulverize its contents. In Bengal (West Bengal, India and Bangladesh), this is called Dhenki, and is still used traditionally in the villages for personal use. This is because it preserves the brown rice coating that is perceived as a healthy part. However, because it is so labor-intensive, its use is gradually decreasing.

Recently, complex mechanical dehuskers or rice hullers powered by gas engines or electricity have replaced many rice pounders.

== Gallery ==
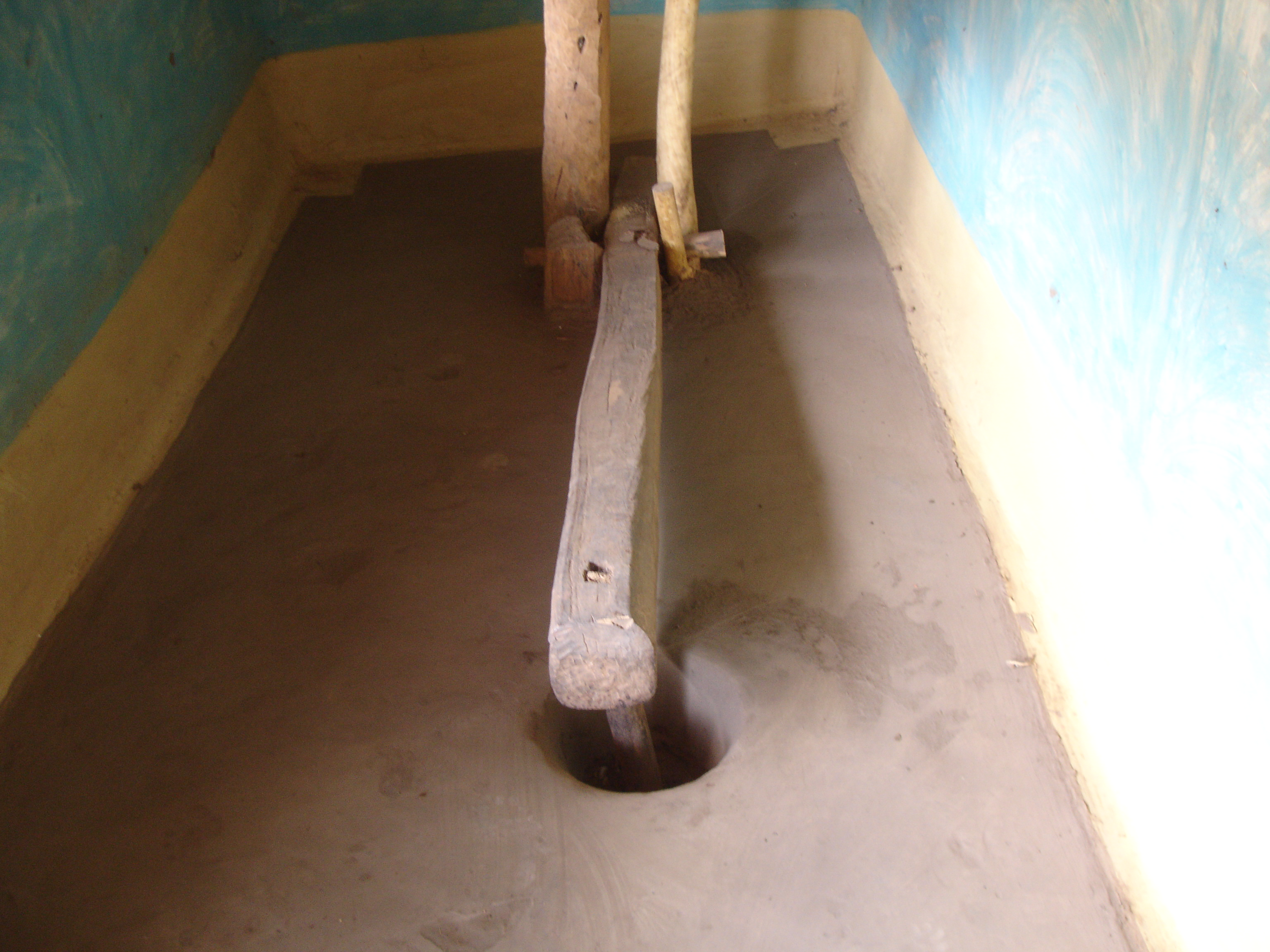
Dheki (a foot-operated wooden rice pounder) in Chhattisgarh Village, India

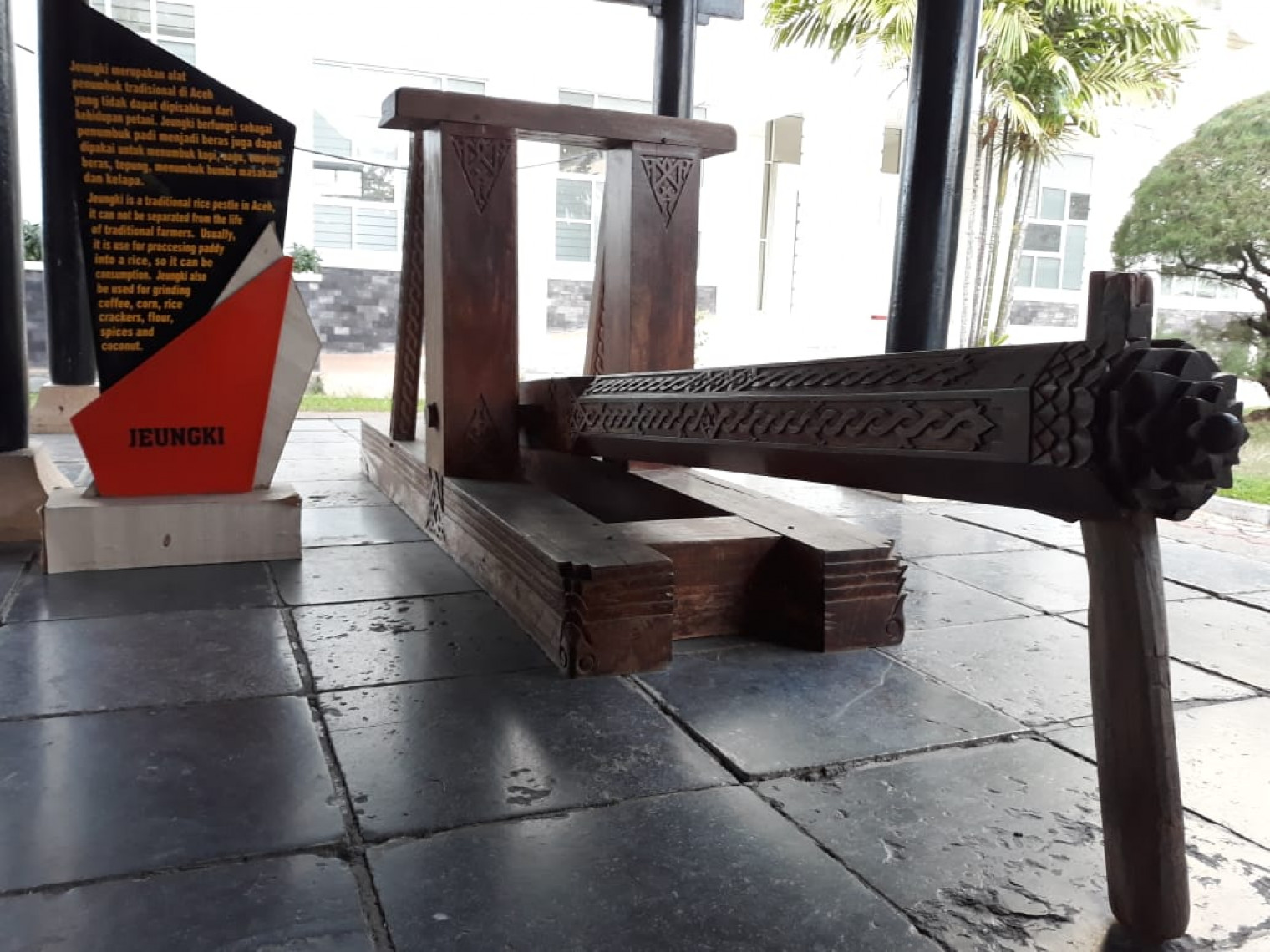
Jeungki, Acehnese rice pounder

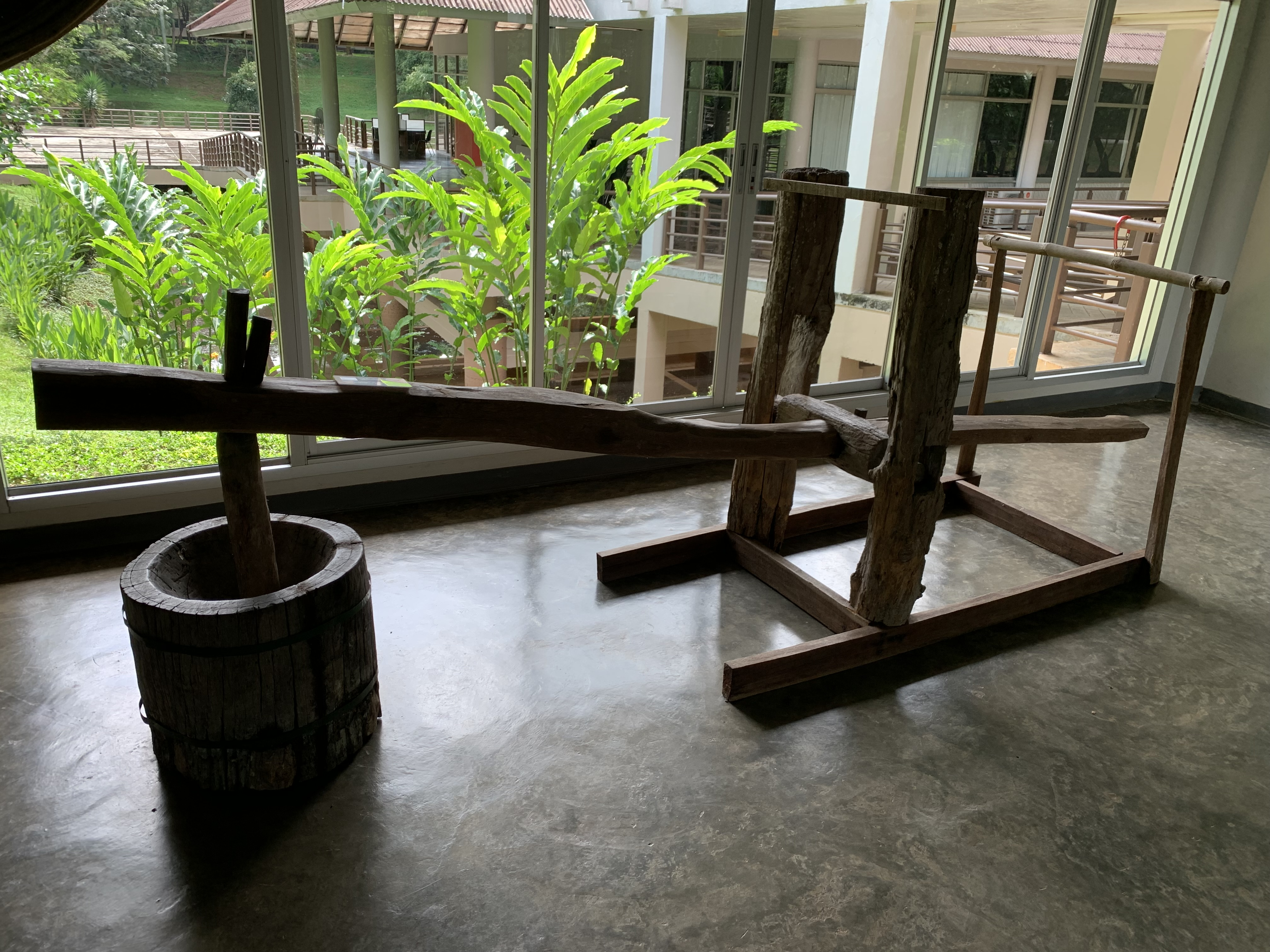
Rice punder from Chiang Rai, Thailand

== See also ==
- Makitra
- Metate
- Millstone
- Muddler
- Mochi, the rice cake made by pounding glutinous rice with mallets
- Molcajete
- Oralu kallu
- Rice hulls
- Winnowing barn
