= Husk =

Outer shell or coating of a seed

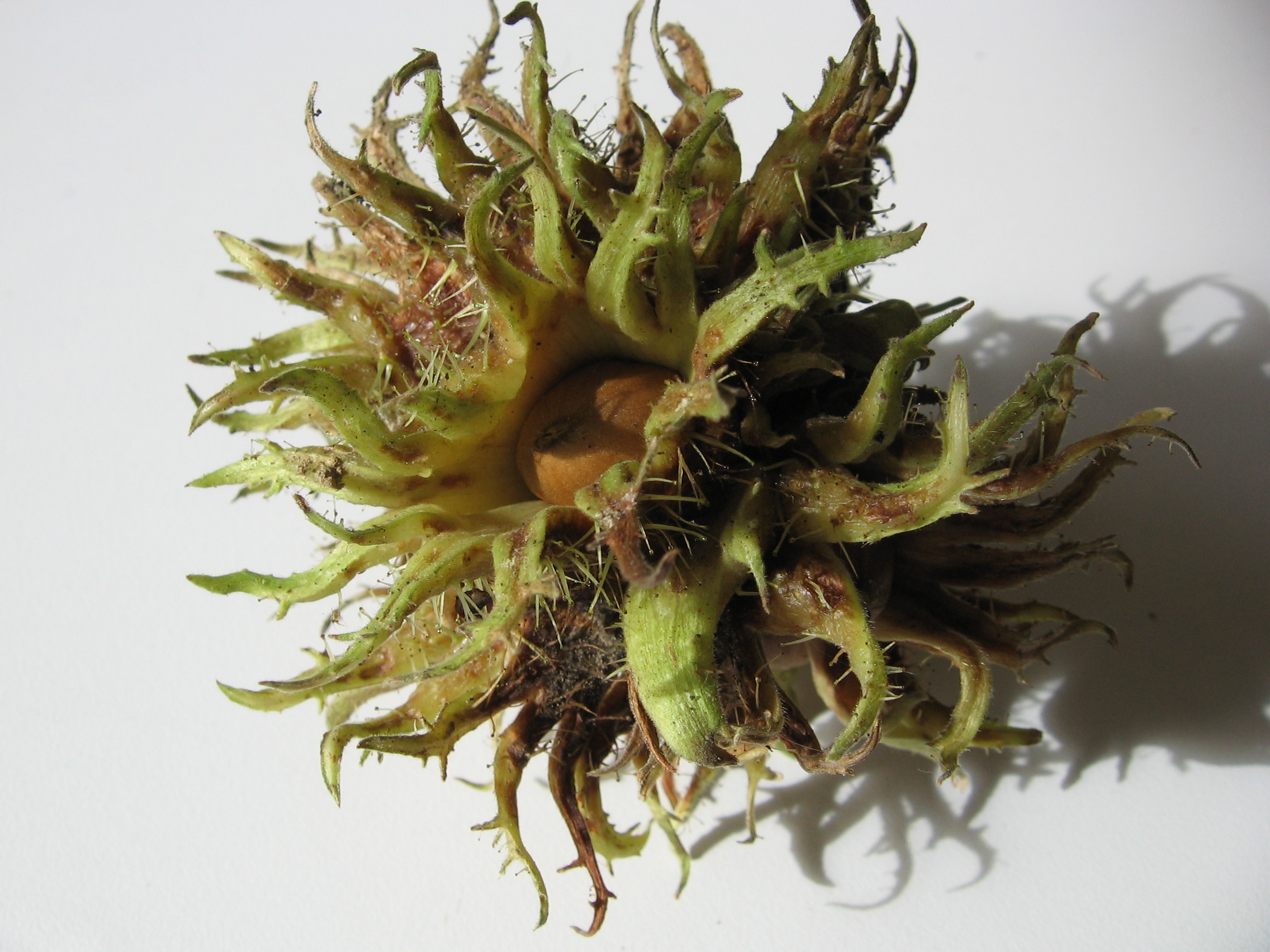
Husk of Corylus colurna (Turkish Hazel), containing 7 nuts

In botany, a husk (or hull) is the outer shell or coating of a seed. In the United States, the term husk often refers to the leafy outer covering of an ear of maize (corn) as it grows on the plant. Literally, a husk or hull includes the protective outer covering of a seed, fruit, or vegetable.

It can also refer to the exuvia of insects or other small animals left behind after moulting.

The term husk dates to c.14, it is probably based on Middle Dutch word huusken meaning 'little house', which is derived from hūs meaning house.

In cooking, hull can also refer to other waste parts of fruits and vegetables, notably the cap or sepal of a strawberry.

Grains such as wheat and barley have husks. The grains are the entire seed of a plant. The seed of a grain (which the grain industry calls a "kernel") is made up of three key edible parts – the bran, the germ, and the endosperm – which are all protected by an inedible husk that protects the kernel from damage by sunlight, pests, water and disease.

== Tree husks ==
In Hazel trees, the nut is surrounded by a short leafy husk (which is technically an involucre). This leaf-like husk encloses most of the nut. It starts off green and will fade to brown at the end of the season. Usually, the ripe nut falls out of (or can be separated from) the husk some 7–8 months after pollination has occurred.

In some places, both shells and the husks of walnuts (Juglans regia L.) which are produced as waste crops during the fruit harvesting and processing, are sometimes burned as fuel for heating purposes. In 2019, it has been demonstrated that the walnut green husk could be valued as a source of different natural bio-active compounds with excellent antioxidant and antimicrobial properties. As well as cosmetic uses. An organic compound Naphthalenone, (derivative of Naphthalene) is found in green walnut husks of Juglans mandshurica Maxim. for various uses. Juglans nigra, black walnut, husks have antioxidant potential. Confusingly, Walnut husks are also called hulls as well. Rhagoletis juglandis, also known as the 'walnut husk fly', is a common pest of walnuts. The larvae are small and live under the surface of the husk of the walnut. They cause damage to the fruit and husks which then become difficult to remove. The husk fly also infests ripe apricot and peach fruits, usually if infested walnuts are located within flying distance.

Some fruit shell and hull derived bio-adsorbents have also been used for wastewater treatment purposes. For example, the almond hull and shell have been used to remove metals such as Pb, Cd, and Co in various quantities. Iranian almond (Prunus amygdalus L.) hulls have antioxidant and anti-radical properties.

The coconut husk and shells can be used for fuel and are a source of charcoal. In Thailand, the coconut husk is used as a potting medium to produce healthy forest tree saplings. A dried half coconut shell with husk can be used to buff floors. It is known as a bunot in the Philippines and simply a "coconut brush" in Jamaica. Coir, also called coconut fibre, is a natural fibre extracted from the outer husk of coconut.

== Husking and dehulling ==
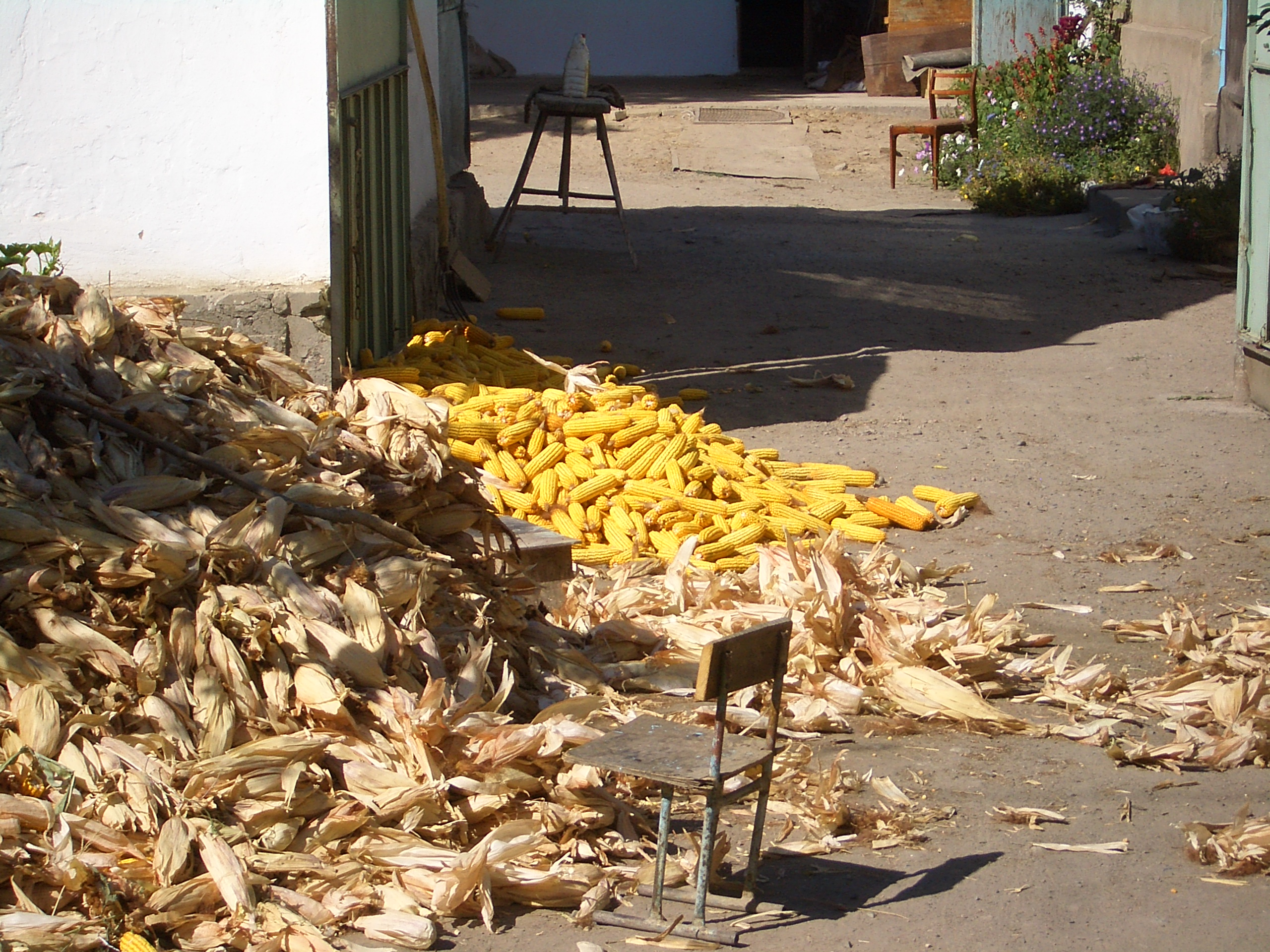
Corn being husked in the yard of a Dungan farmer in Kyrgyzstan

Husking of corn is the process of removing its outer layers, leaving only the cob or seed rack of the corn. Dehulling is the process of removing the hulls (or chaff) from beans and other seeds. This is sometimes done using a machine known as a huller. To prepare the seeds to have oils extracted from them, they are cleaned to remove any foreign objects. Next, the seeds have their hulls, or outer coverings, or husk, removed. There are three different types of dehulling systems that can be used to process soybeans: Hot dehulling, warm dehulling and cold dehulling. Hot dehulling is the system offered in areas where beans are processed directly from the field. Warm dehulling is often used by processors who import their soybeans. Cold dehulling is used in plants that have existing drying and conditioning equipment, but need to add dehulling equipment to produce high protein meal. The different dehulling temperature options are for different types of production, beans and preparation equipment.

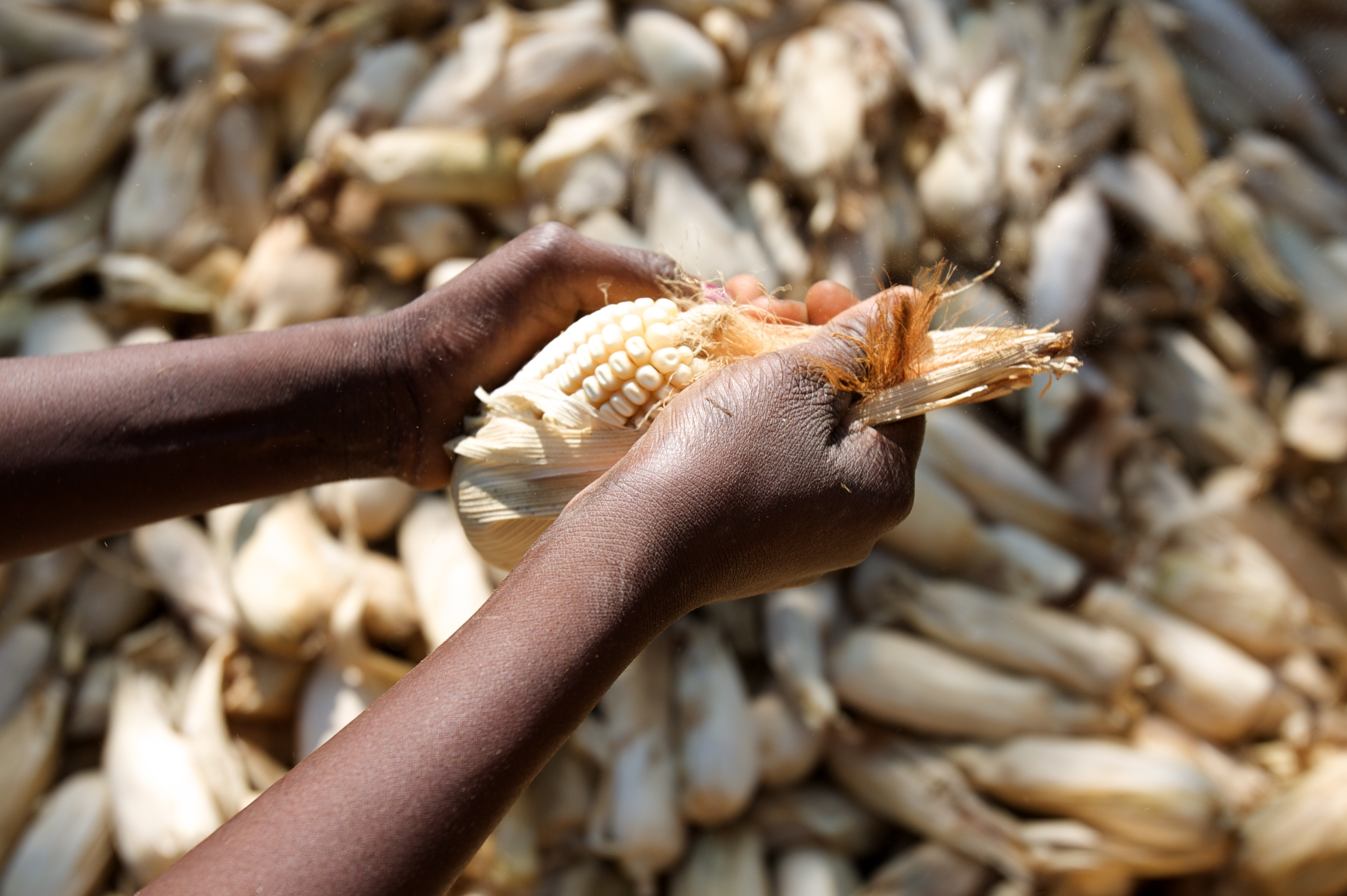
A woman manually dehusking corn in Malawi. People working in subsistence agricultural settings tend not to have the mechanization of processing practices to reduce the labor. In many societies, this labor falls to family members such as women, who make up the majority of farmers working in smallholdings.

In third-world countries, husking and dehulling is still often done by hand using a large mortar and pestle. These are usually made of wood, and operated by one or more people.

The husk is biodegradable and may be composted.

== See also ==
- Gum (botany)
- Horsebread, a type of bread in which the chaff is not removed
- Peel
- Rice hulls
- Rice pounder
- Threshing
- Winnowing
