= Winnowing =

Method of separating grain from chaff

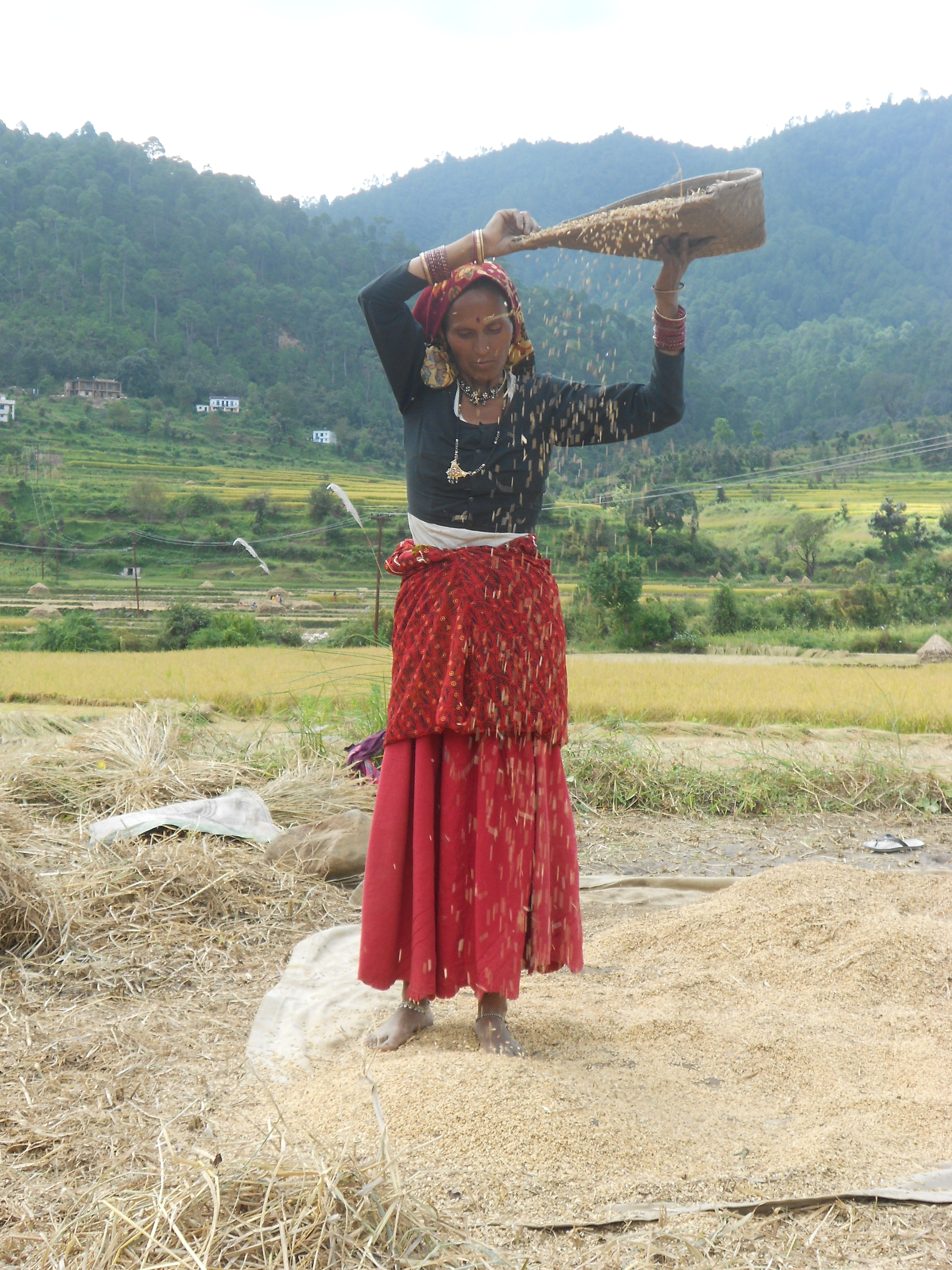
Rice winnowing, Uttarakhand, India

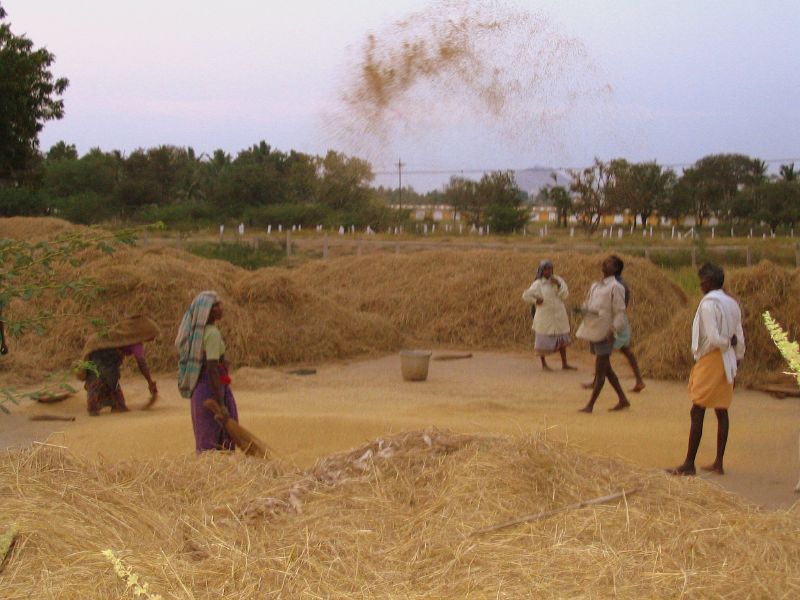
Winnowing in a village in Tamil Nadu, India

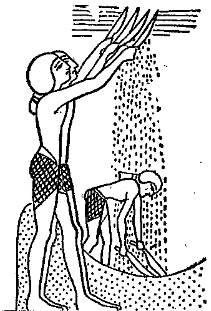
Use of winnowing forks by ancient Egyptian agriculturalists

Winnowing is a process by which chaff is separated from grain. It can also be used to remove pests from stored grain. Winnowing usually follows threshing in grain preparation. In its simplest form, it involves throwing the mixture into the air so that the wind blows away the lighter chaff, while the heavier grains fall back down for recovery. Techniques included using a winnowing fan (a shaped basket shaken to raise the chaff) or using a tool (a winnowing fork or shovel) on a pile of harvested grain.

== In Greek culture ==
The winnowing-fan (λίκνον [líknon], also meaning a "cradle") featured in the rites accorded Dionysus and in the Eleusinian Mysteries: "it was a simple agricultural implement taken over and mysticized by the religion of Dionysus," Jane Ellen Harrison remarked. Dionysus Liknites ("Dionysus of the winnowing fan") was wakened by the Dionysian women, in this instance called Thyiades, in a cave on Parnassus high above Delphi; the winnowing-fan links the god connected with the mystery religions to the agricultural cycle, but mortal Greek babies too were laid in a winnowing-fan. In Callimachus's Hymn to Zeus, Adrasteia lays the infant Zeus in a golden líknon, her goat suckles him and he is given honey. In the Odyssey, the dead oracle Teiresias tells Odysseus to walk away from Ithaca with an oar until a wayfarer tells him it is a winnowing fan (i.e., until Odysseus has come so far from the sea that people don't recognize oars), and there to build a shrine to Poseidon.

== China ==
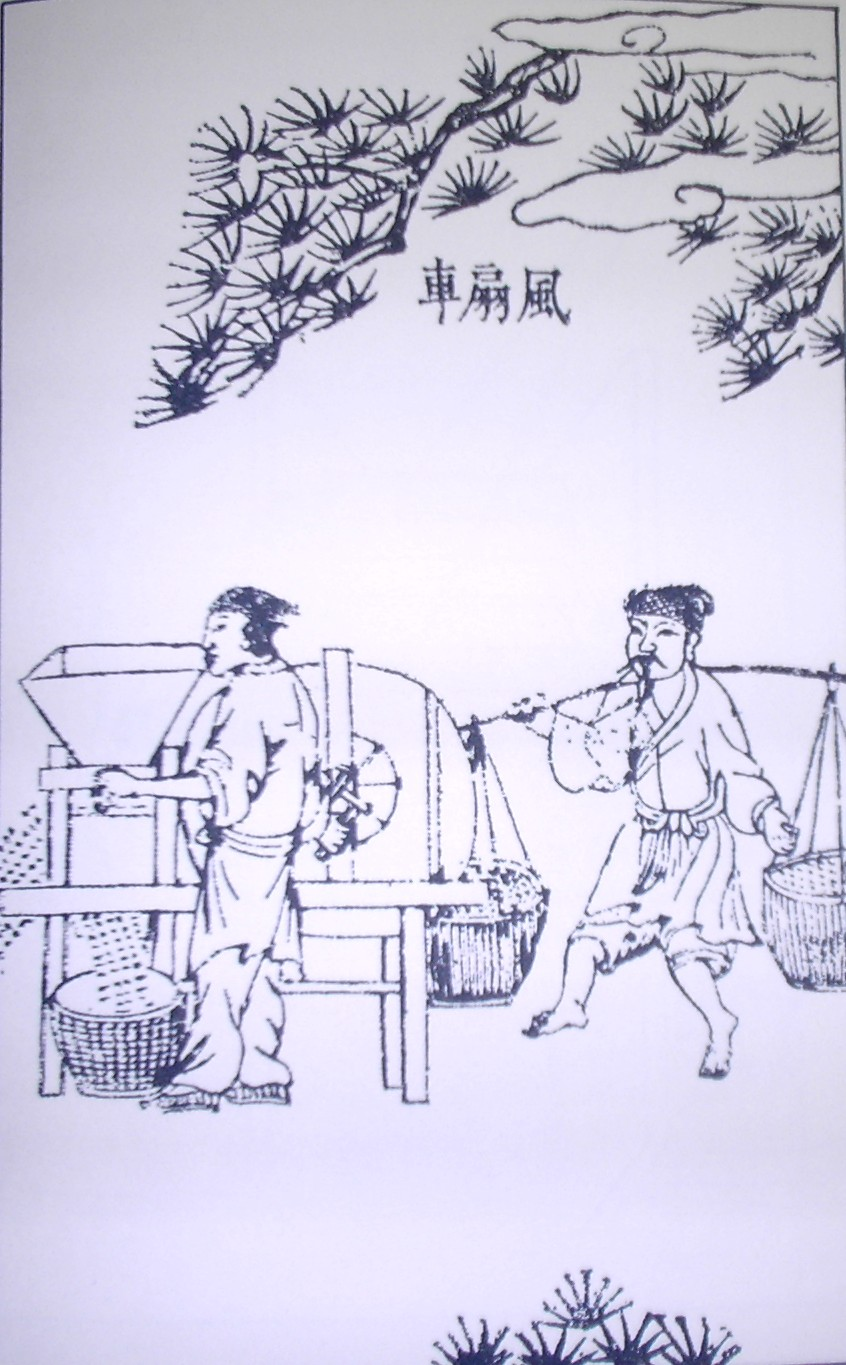
Chinese rotary fan winnowing machine, from the Tiangong Kaiwu encyclopedia (1637)

In ancient China, the method was improved by mechanization with the development of the rotary winnowing fan, which used a cranked fan to produce the airstream. This was featured in Wang Zhen's book the Nong Shu of 1313 AD.

== In Europe ==
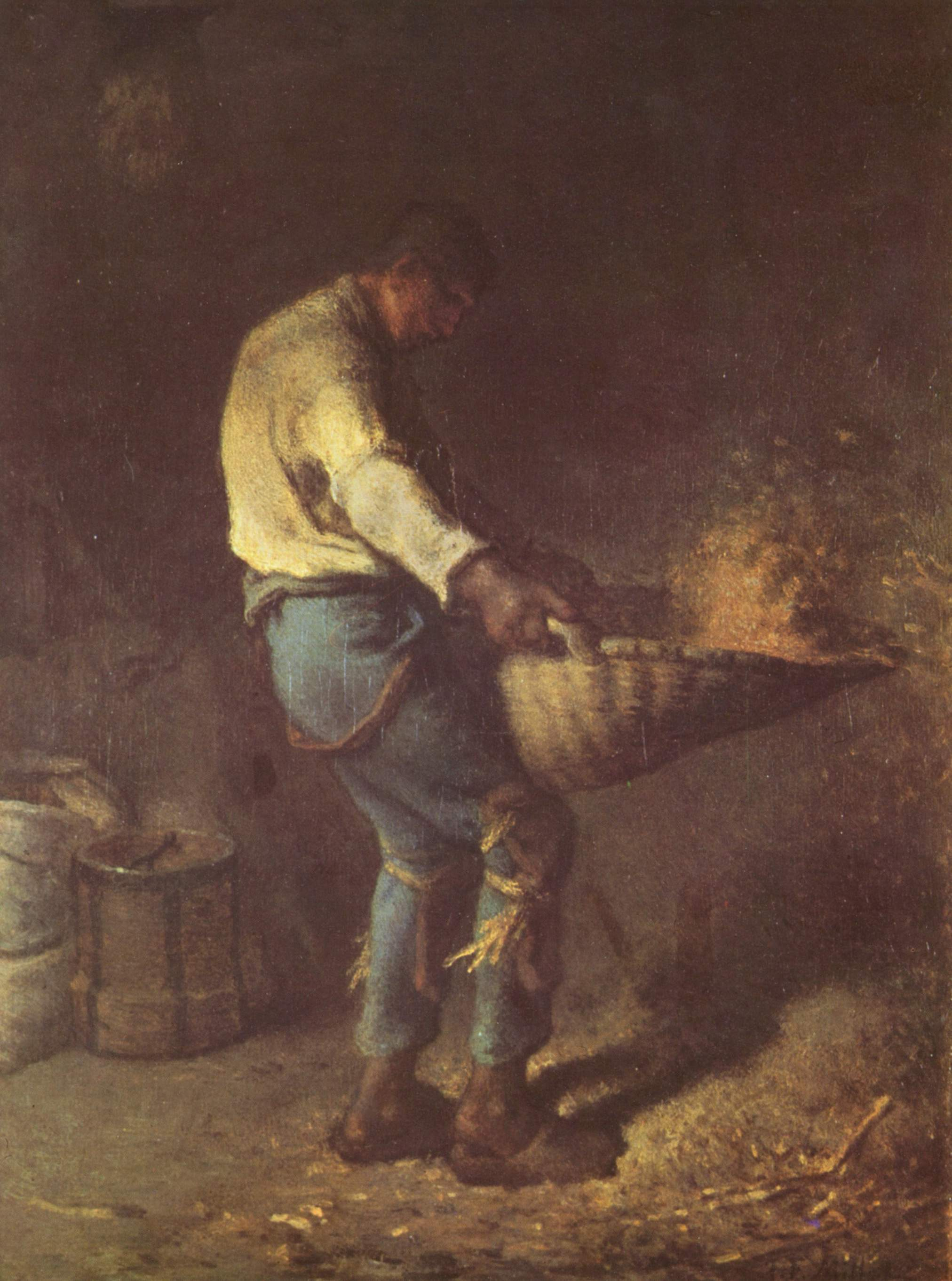
Le vanneur (The Winnower) by Jean-François Millet, a 19th-century depiction of winnowing by fan

In Saxon settlements such as one identified in Northumberland as Bede's Ad Gefrin (now called Yeavering) the buildings were shown by an excavator's reconstruction to have opposed entries. In barns a draught created by the use of these opposed doorways was used in winnowing.

The technique developed by the Chinese was not adopted in Europe until the 18th century when winnowing machines used a 'sail fan'. The rotary winnowing fan was exported to Europe, brought there by Dutch sailors between 1700 and 1720. Apparently, they had obtained them from the Dutch settlement of Batavia in Java, Dutch East Indies. The Swedes imported some from south China at about the same time and Jesuits had taken several to France from China by 1720. Until the beginning of the 18th century, no rotary winnowing fans existed in the West.

== In the United States ==
The development of the winnowing barn allowed rice plantations in South Carolina to increase their yields dramatically.

== Mechanization of the process ==
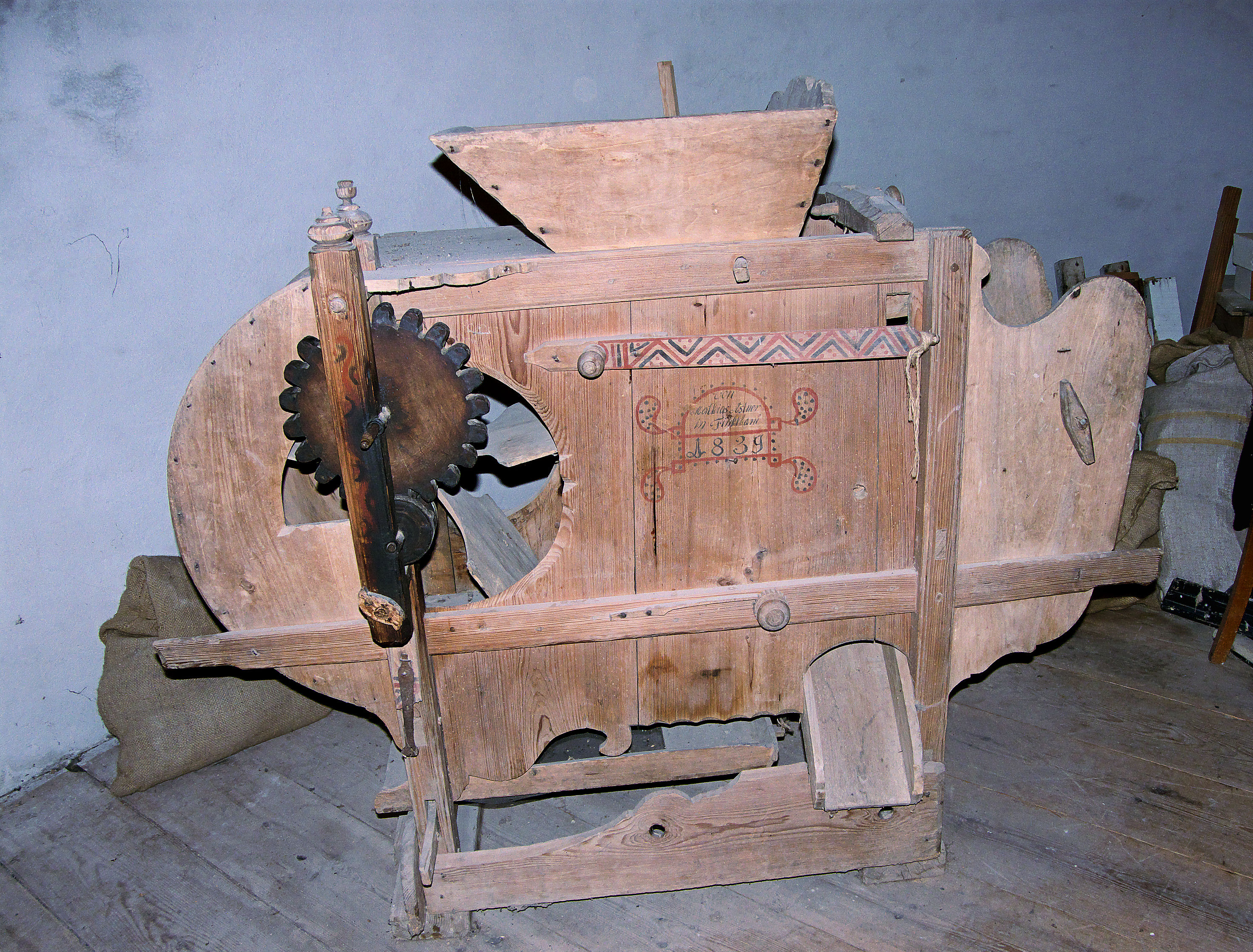
Winnowing machine from 1839

In 1737 Andrew Rodger, a farmer on the estate of Cavers in Roxburghshire, developed a winnowing machine for corn, called a 'Fanner'. These were successful and the family sold them throughout Scotland for many years. Some Scottish Presbyterian ministers saw the fanners as sins against God, for the wind was a thing specially made by him and an artificial wind was a daring and impious attempt to usurp what belonged to God alone. As the Industrial Revolution progressed, the winnowing process was mechanized by the invention of additional winnowing machines, such as fanning mills.

== See also ==
- Rice huller
- Rice pounder
- Sieving
- Threshing
- Winnowing (sedimentology)
