= Threshing =

Separating edible grain from straw

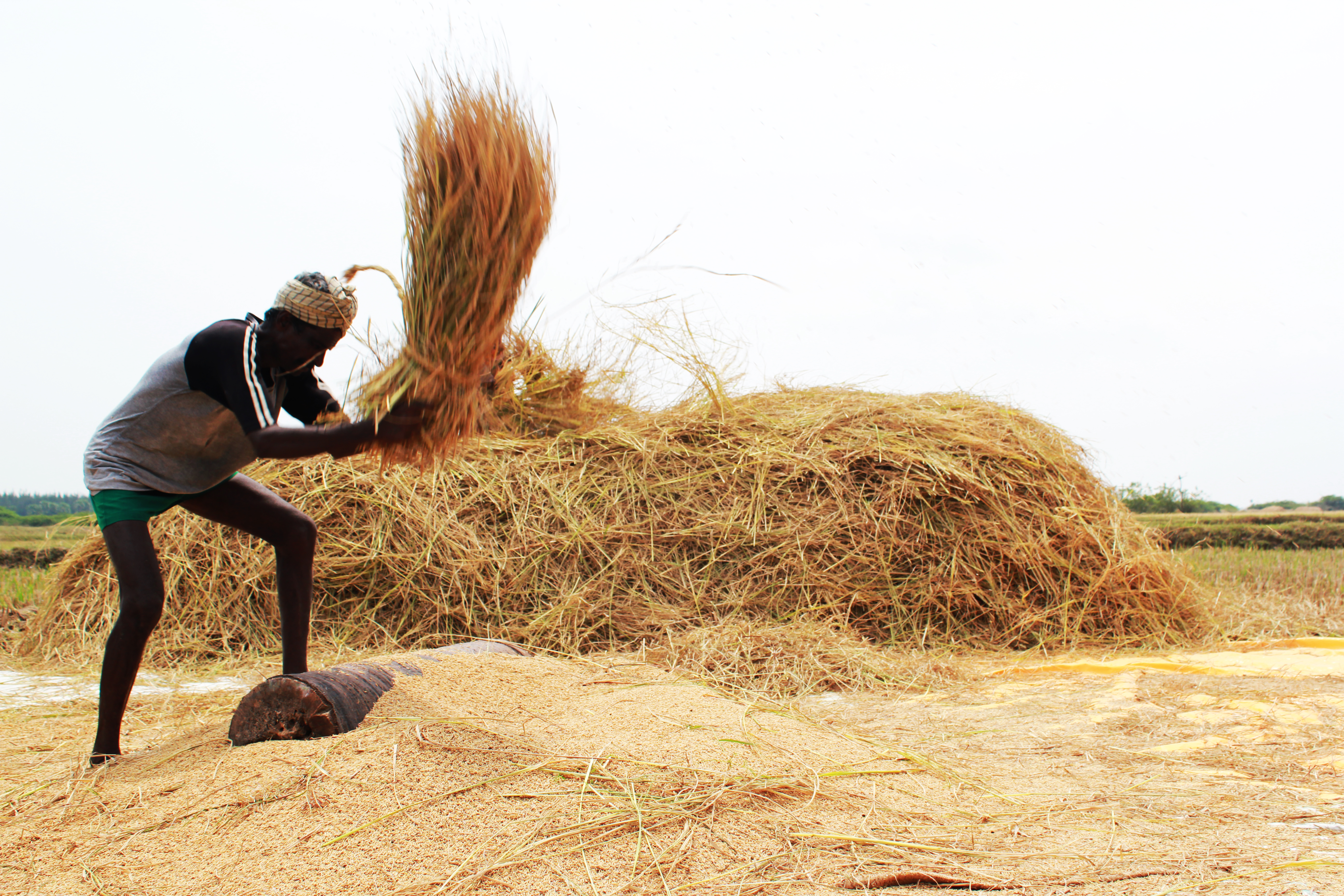
A farmer in India threshes grain by hand.

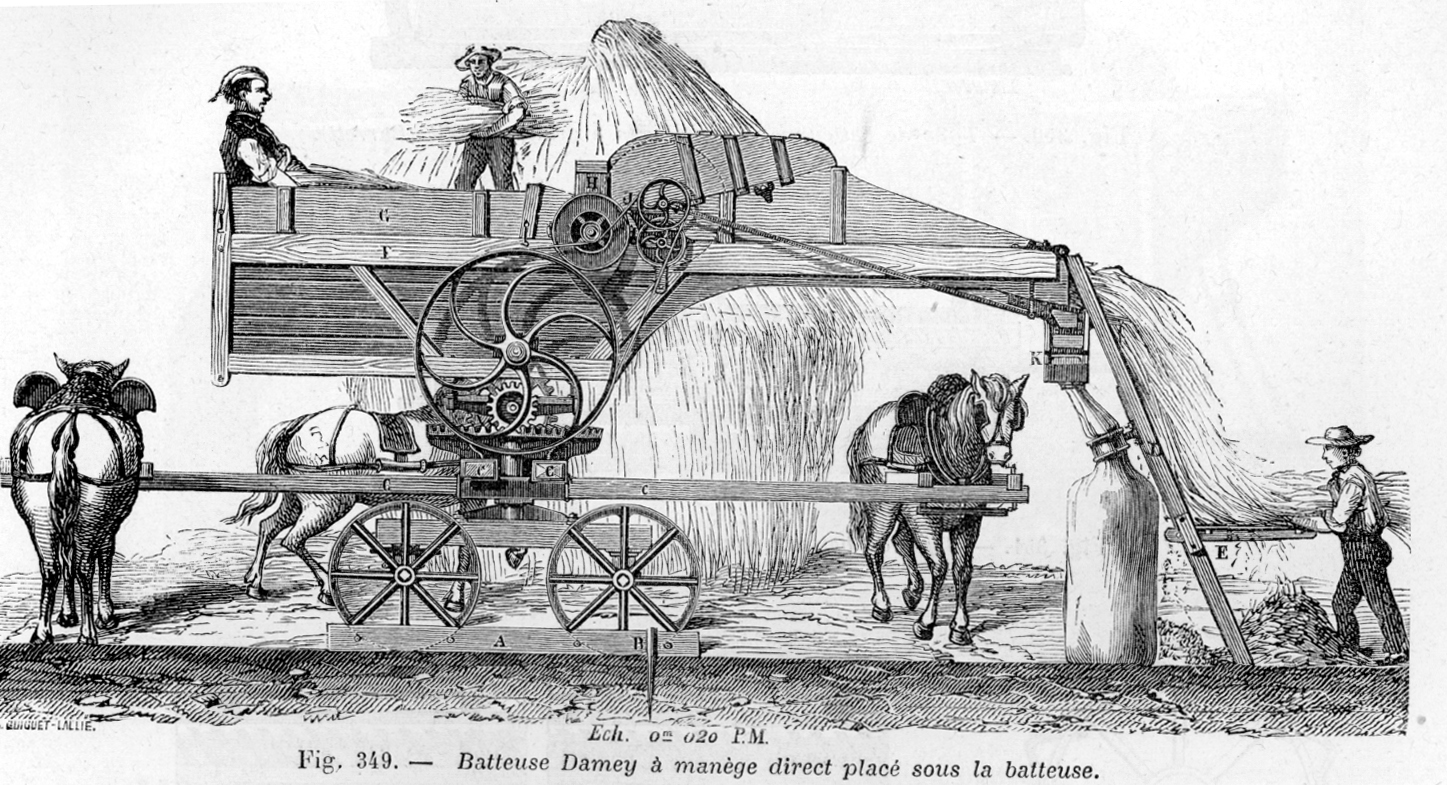
An animal-powered thresher

Threshing, or thrashing, is the process of loosening the edible part of grain (or other crop) from the straw to which it is attached. It is the step in grain preparation after reaping. Threshing does not remove the bran from the grain.

== History of threshing ==
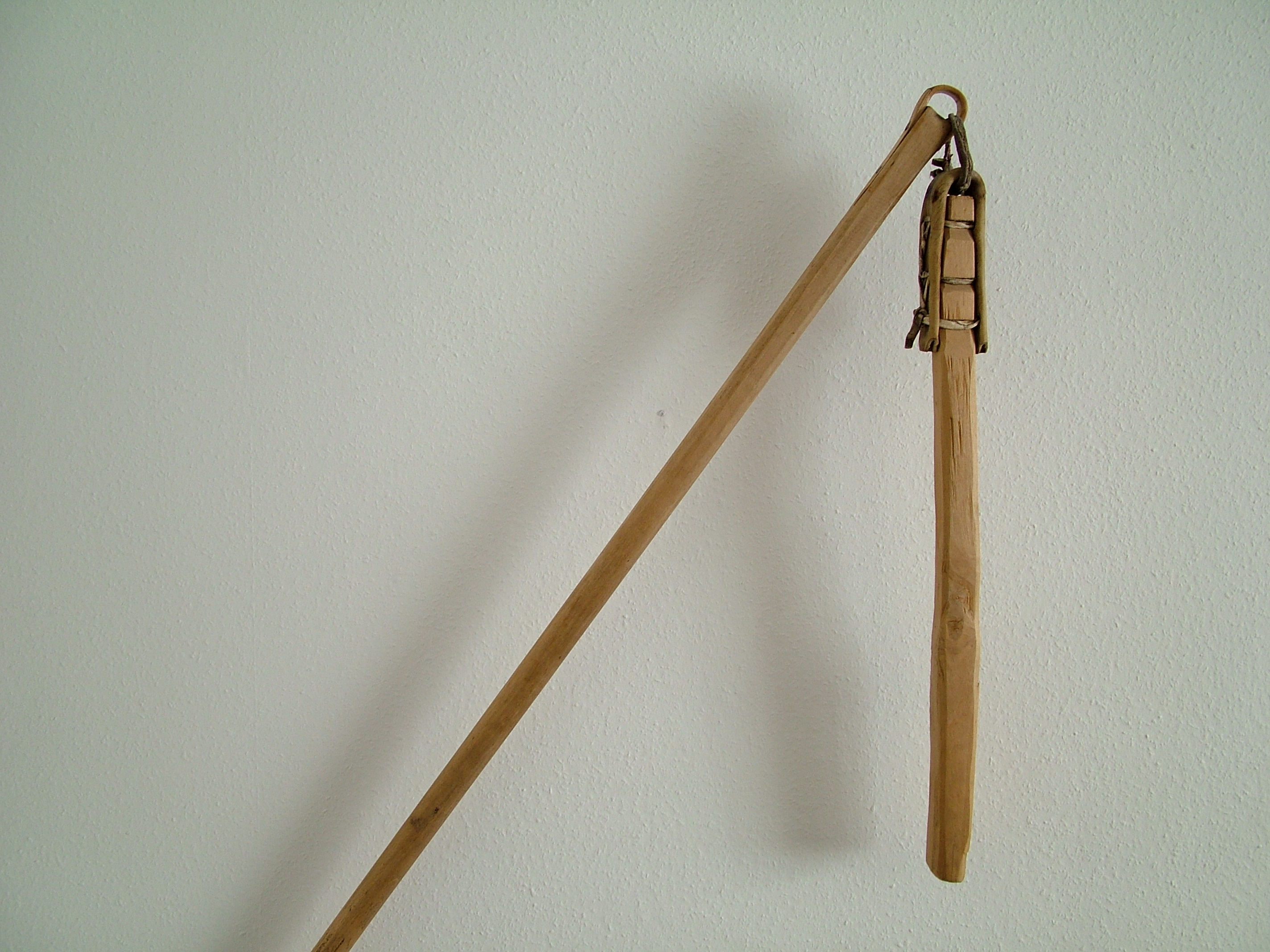
A grain flail

Through much of the important history of agriculture, threshing was time-consuming and usually laborious, with a bushel of wheat taking about an hour. In the late 18th century, before threshing was mechanized, about one-quarter of agricultural labor was devoted to it.

It is likely that in the earliest days of agriculture the little grain that was raised was shelled by hand, but as the quantity increased the grain was probably beaten out with a stick, or the sheaf beaten upon the ground. An improvement on this, as the quantity further increased, was the practice of the ancient Egyptians of spreading out the loosened sheaves on a circular enclosure of hard ground, and driving oxen, sheep or other animals round and round over it so as to tread out the grain. This enclosure was placed on an elevated piece of ground so that when the straw was removed the wind blew away the chaff and left the grain. A contemporary version of this in some locations is to spread the grain on the surface of a country road so the grain may be threshed by the wheels of passing vehicles.

This method, however, damaged part of the grain, and it was partially superseded by the threshing sledge, a heavy frame mounted with three or more rollers, sometimes spiked, which revolved as it was drawn over the spread out grain by two oxen. A common sledge with a ridged or grooved bottom was also used. Similar methods to these were used by the ancient Greeks, and continued to be employed in the modern period in some places. In Italy the use of a tapering roller fastened to an upright shaft in the centre of the thrashing floor and pulled round from the outer end by oxen seems to be a descendant of the Roman tribulum or roller sledge.

Threshing wheat with a flail. A demonstration in slow motion.

The flail, a pair of connected sticks used to beat the grain, evolved from the early method of using a single stick. It, with the earlier methods, was described by Pliny the Elder in his first-century CE Natural History: "The cereals are threshed in some places with the threshing board on the threshing floor; in others they are trampled by a train of horses, and in others they are beaten with flails". It seems to have been the thrashing implement in general use in all Northern European countries, and was the chief means of thrashing grain as late as 1860. It was known in Japan very early, and was probably used in conjunction with the stripper, an implement fashioned very much like a large comb, with the teeth made of hard wood and pointing upwards. The straw after being reaped was brought to this and combed through by hand, the heads being drawn off and afterwards threshed on the threshing floor by the flail. Much more recently, just such an implement, known as a "heckle", has been used for combing the bolls or heads off flax, or for straightening the fibre in the after-treatment.

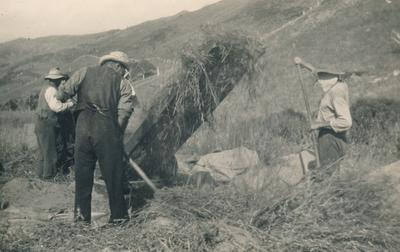
Harvesters threshing in Akaroa, Canterbury, New Zealand

After the grain had been beaten out by the flail or ground out by other means the straw was carefully raked away and the grain and chaff collected to be separated by winnowing when there was a wind blowing. This consisted of tossing the mixture of grain and chaff into the air so that the wind carried away the chaff while the grain fell back on the threshing floor. The best grain fell nearest while the lightest grain was carried some distance before falling, thus an approximate grading of the grain was obtained. It was also performed when there was no wind by fanning while pouring the mixture from a vessel. Later, a fanning or winnowing mill was invented. Barns were constructed with large doors opening in the direction of the prevailing winds so that the wind could blow right through the barn and across the threshing floor for the purpose of winnowing the grain. The flail continued to be used for special purposes such as flower seeds, and also where the quantity grown was small enough to render it not worth while to use a threshing mill.

With regard to the amount of grain threshed in a day by the flail, a fair average quantity was 8 bushels of wheat, 30 bushels of oats, 16 bushels of barley, 20 bushels of beans, 8 bushels of rye and 20 bushels of buckwheat.

== Mechanization ==
In the 18th century there were efforts to create a power-driven threshing machine. In 1732 Michael Menzies, a Scot, obtained a patent for a power-driven machine. This was arranged to drive a large number of flails operated by water power, but was not particularly successful. The first practical effort leading in the right direction was made by a Scottish farmer named Leckie about 1758. He invented what was described as a "rotary machine consisting of a set of cross arms attached to a horizontal shaft and enclosed in a cylindrical case." This machine did not work very well, but it demonstrated the superiority of the rotary motion and pointed to the ways in which thrashing machines should be constructed.

True industrialization of threshing began in 1786 with the invention of the threshing machine by Scot Andrew Meikle. In this the loosened sheaves were fed, ears first, from a feeding board between two fluted revolving rollers to the beating cylinder. This cylinder or "drum" was armed with four iron-shod beaters or spars of wood parallel to its axle, and these striking the ears as they protruded from the rollers knocked out the grain. The drum revolved at 200 to 250 revolutions per minute and carried the loose grain and straw on to a concave sieve beneath another revolving drum or rake with pegs which rubbed the straw on to the concave and caused the grain and chaff to fall through. Another revolving rake tossed the straw out of the machine. The straw thus passing under one peg drum and over the next was subjected to a thorough rubbing and tossing which separated the grain and chaff from it. These fell on to the floor beneath, ready for winnowing.

A later development of the beater-drum was to fix iron pegs on the framework, and thus was evolved the Scottish "peg-mill," which remained the standard type for nearly a hundred years, and was adopted across the US. In Britain, the development of high-speed drums carried considerable risk, and a type of safety guard was mandated by the Threshing Machines Act 1878.

== Contemporary industrialization ==
In modern developed areas, threshing is mostly done by machine, usually by a combine harvester, which harvests, threshes, and winnows the grain while it is still in the field.

The cereal may be stored in a barn or silos.

== Threshing festivals ==
A threshing bee was traditionally a bee in which local people gathered together to pitch in and get the season's threshing done. Such bees were sometimes festivals or events within larger harvest festivals. The original purpose has largely become obsolete, but the festival tradition lives on in some modern examples that commemorate the past and include flea markets, hog wrestling, and dances.

== Gallery ==
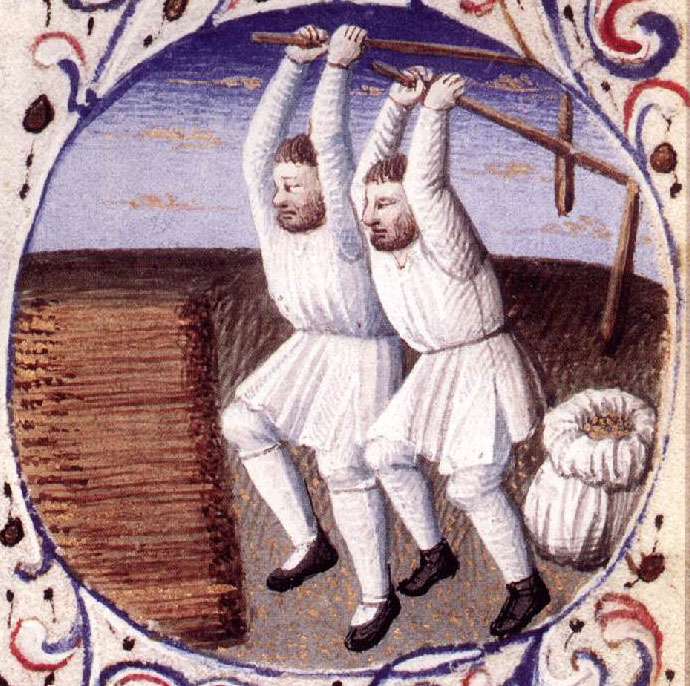
Medieval image of threshing men

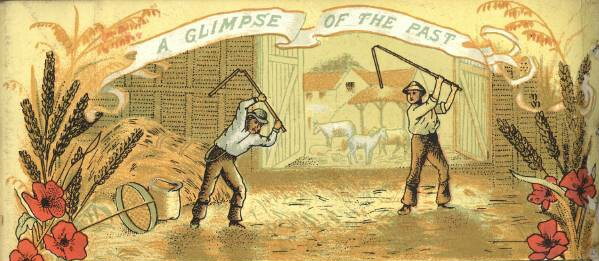
Threshing with hand flails, Great Britain, c. 1750. Image from c. 1875.

Irreler Bauertradition shows threshing by hand. Roscheider Hof Open Air Museum.

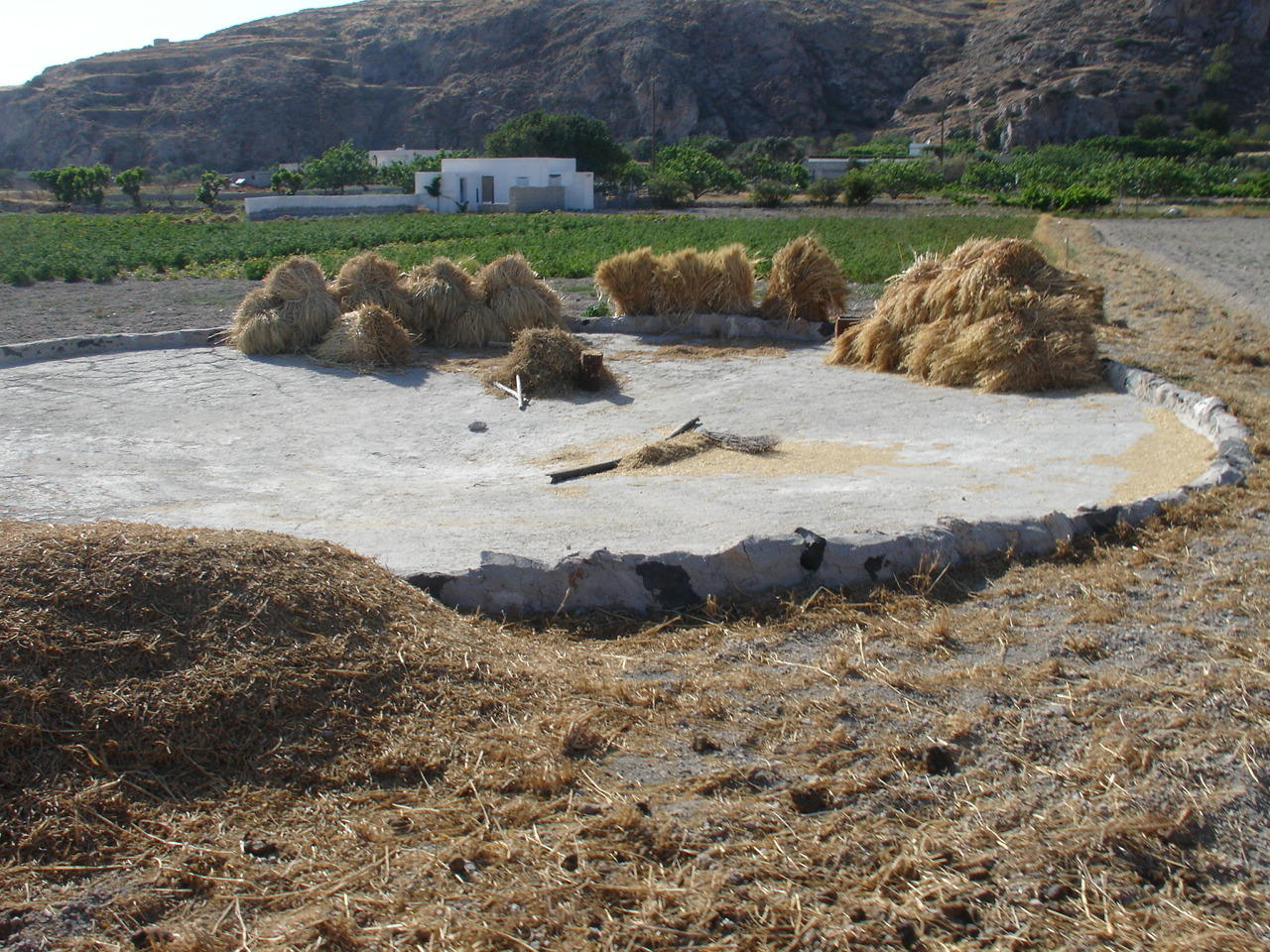
Threshing floor, Santorini, Greece

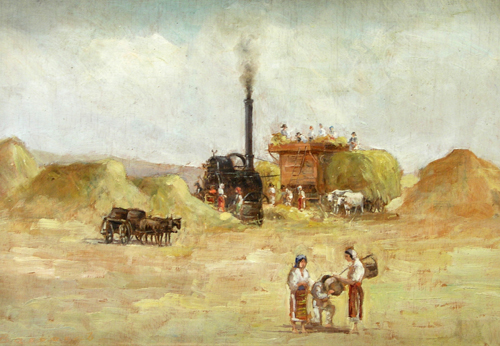
Ludovic Bassarab's La treierat ("Threshing"), showing peasants in Romanian dress around a combine harvester

Threshing rice by hand (view in Full HD)

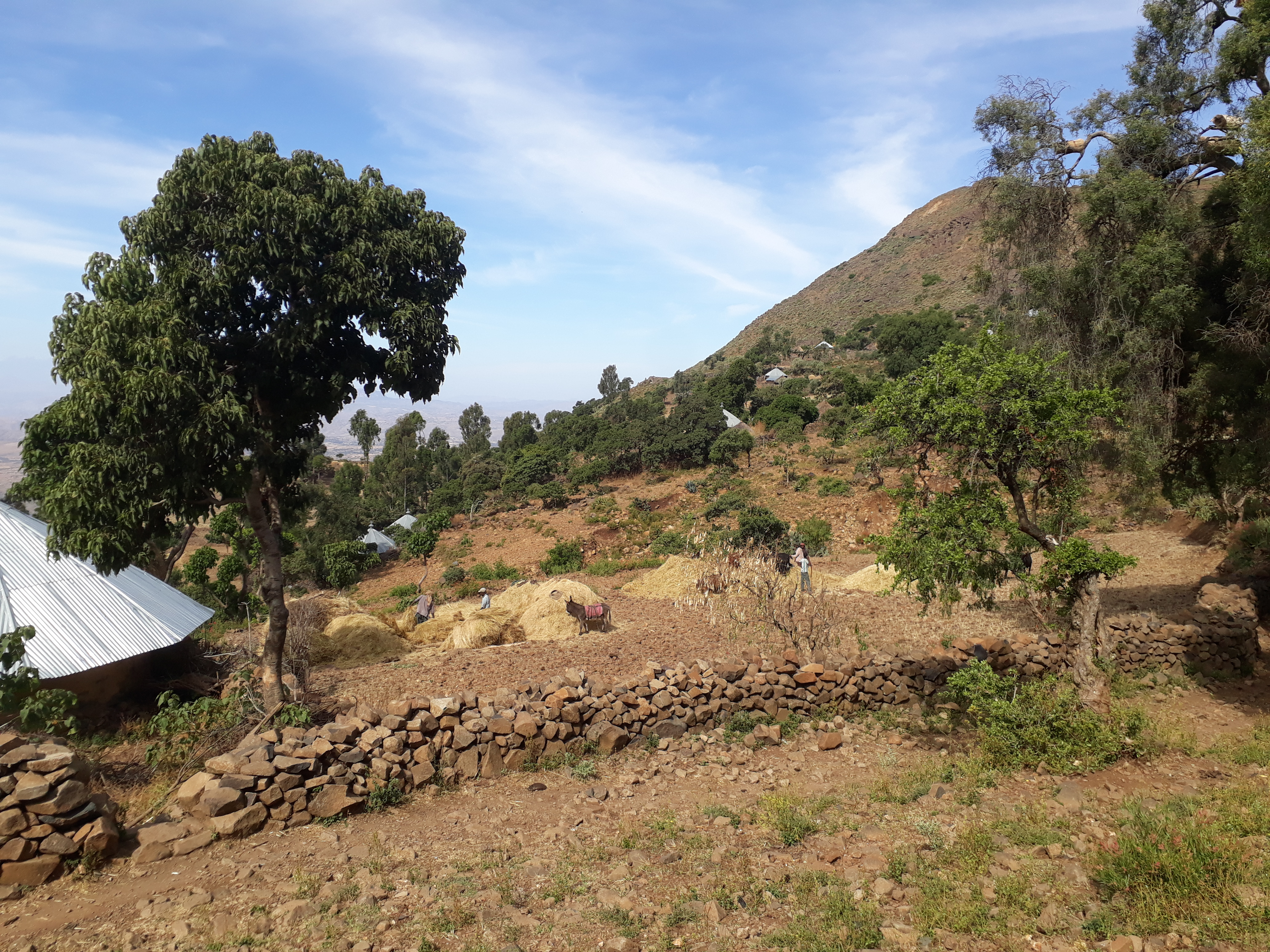
Threshing in Gumuara (Ethiopia)

Threshing with yaks in Astore, Gilgit-Baltistan

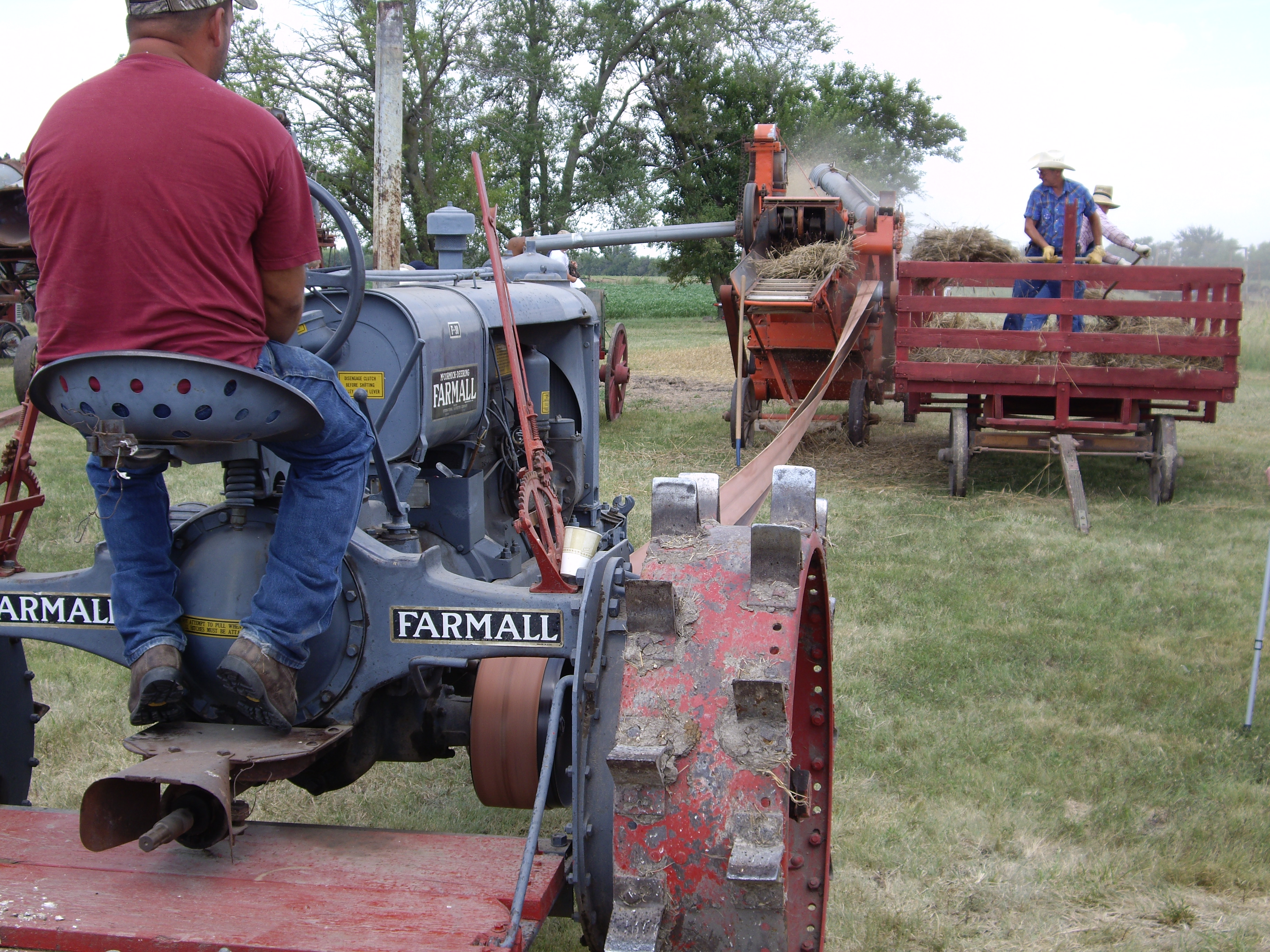
Wheat threshing demonstration at Goessel Threshing Days in Goessel, Kansas, 2010

Video of a petrol-powered machine threshing rice in Hainan, China

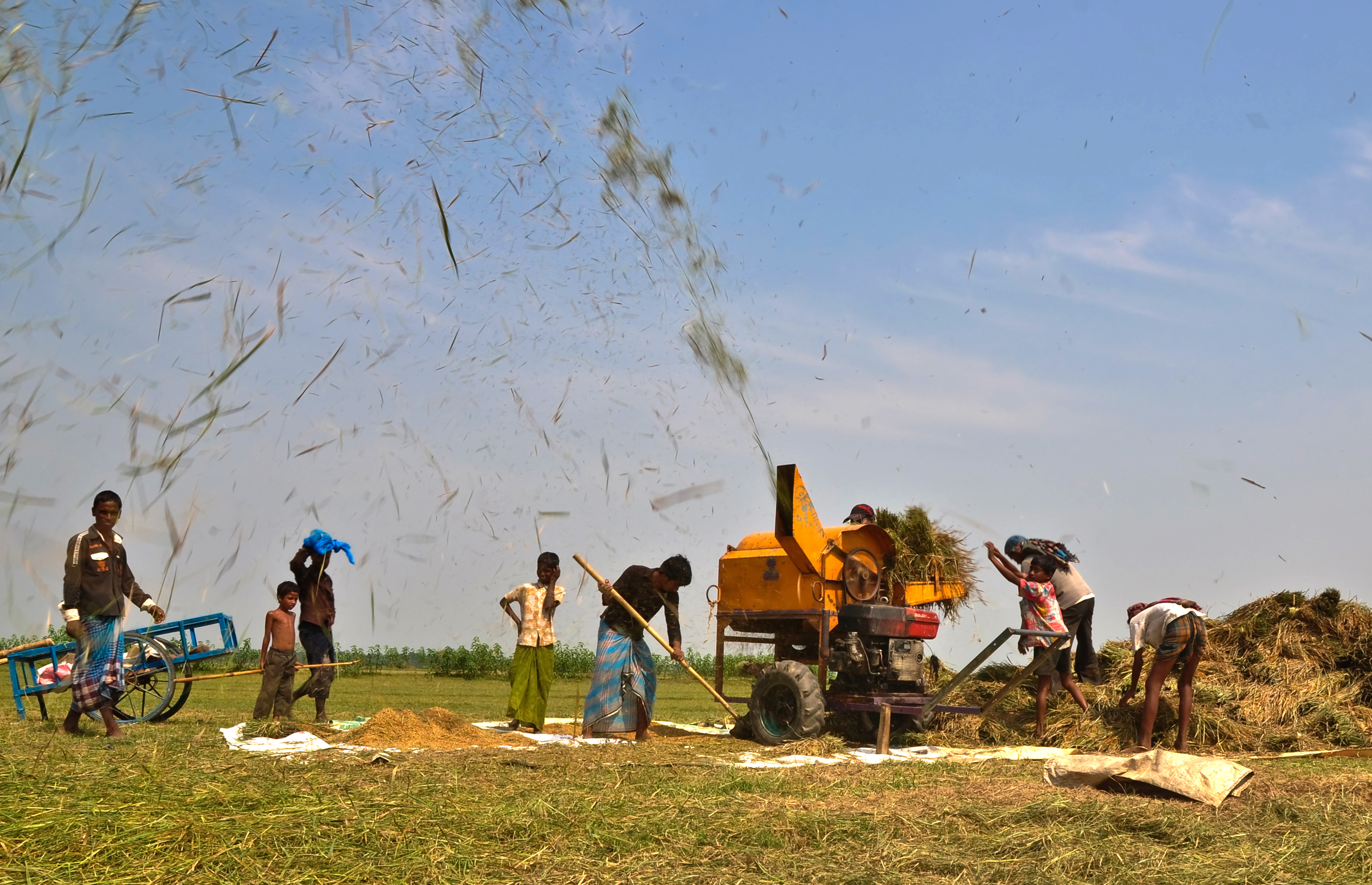
Threshing of paddy by machine, Bangladesh

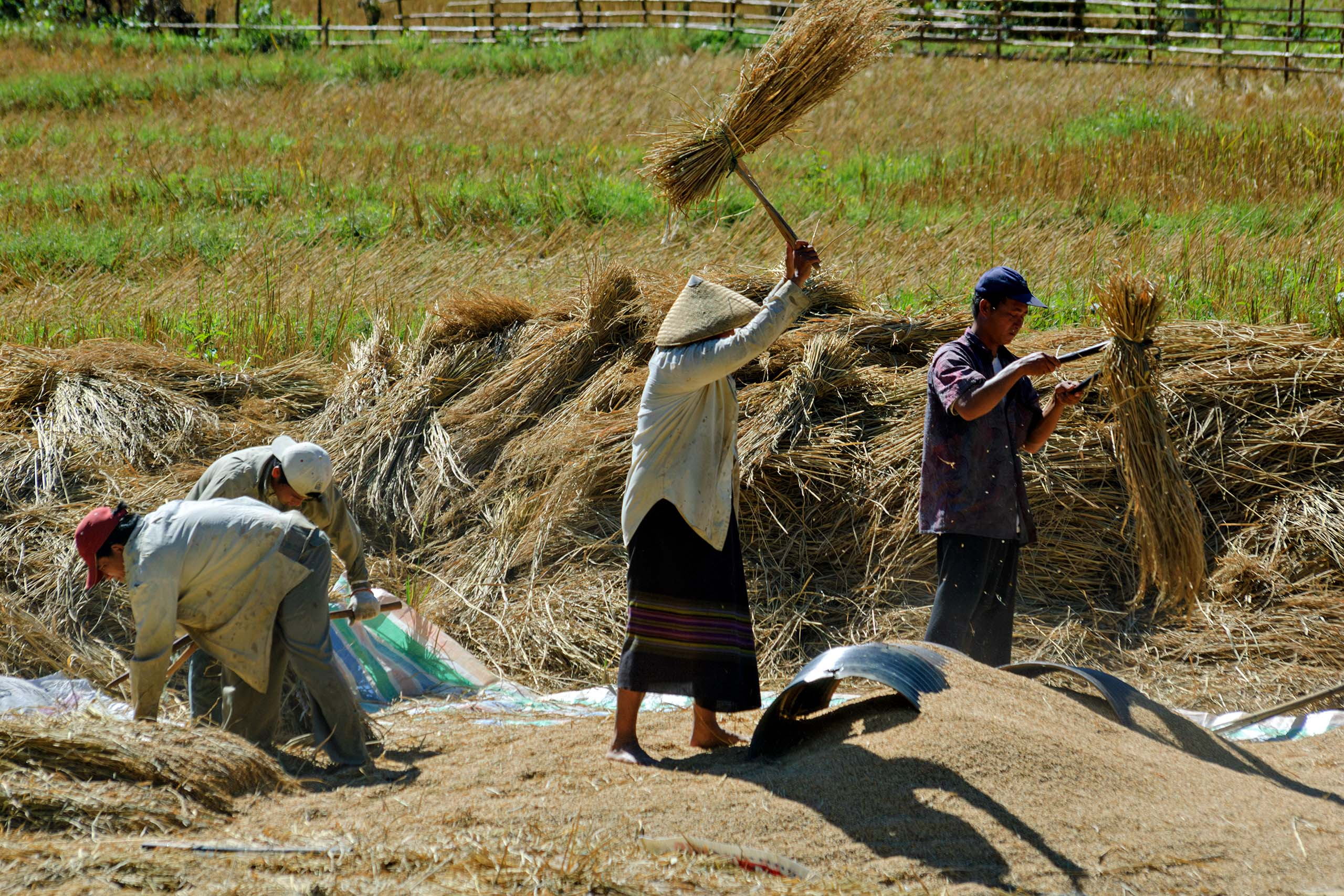
Threshing of rice by hand by a woman and men, near Vang Vieng, Laos

== See also ==
- Swing Riots
- Threshing-board
- Threshing floor
- Threshing machine
- Thresherman
- Threshing stone
- Winnowing
