= Threshing floor =

Agricultural site

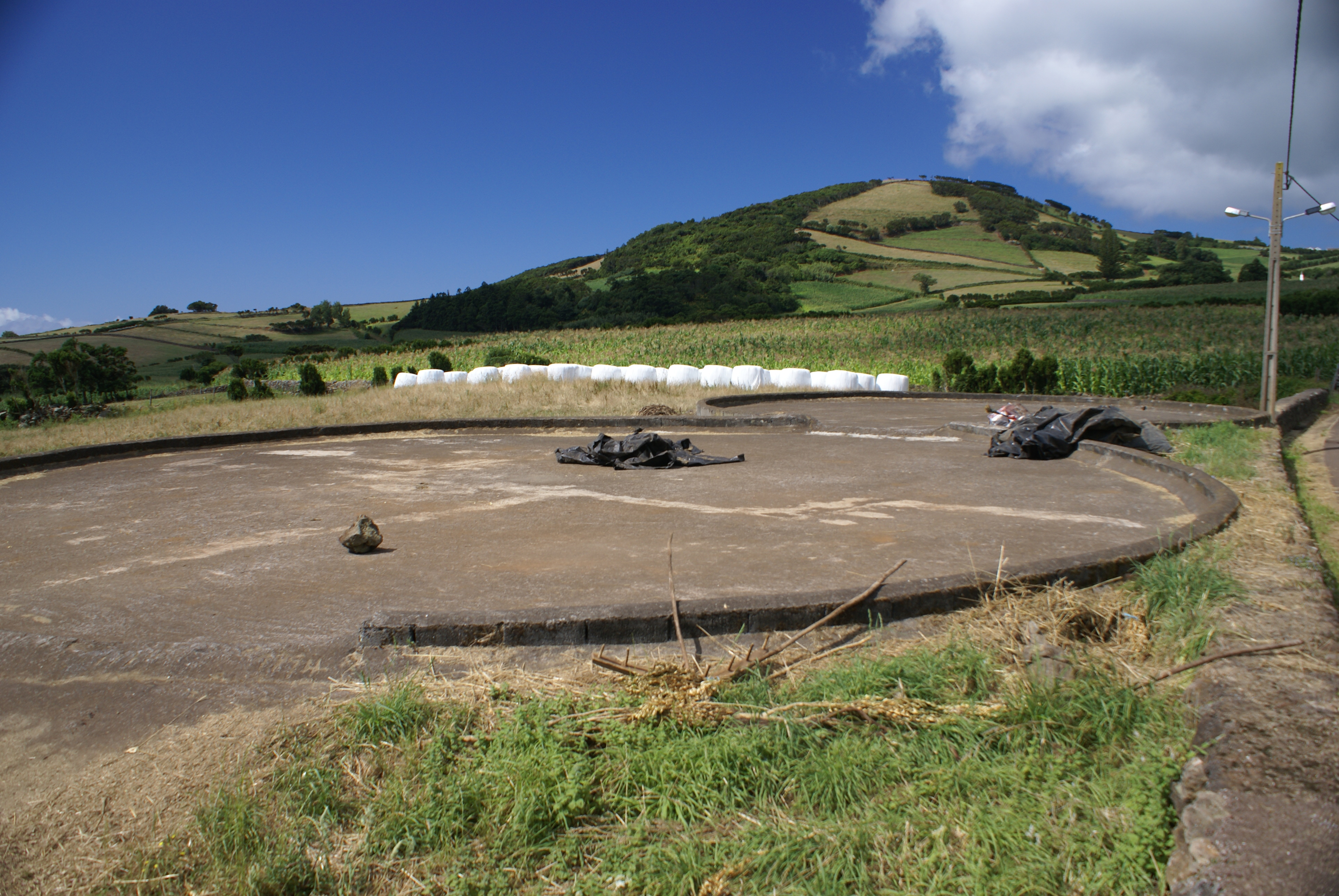
A threshing floor on São Jorge

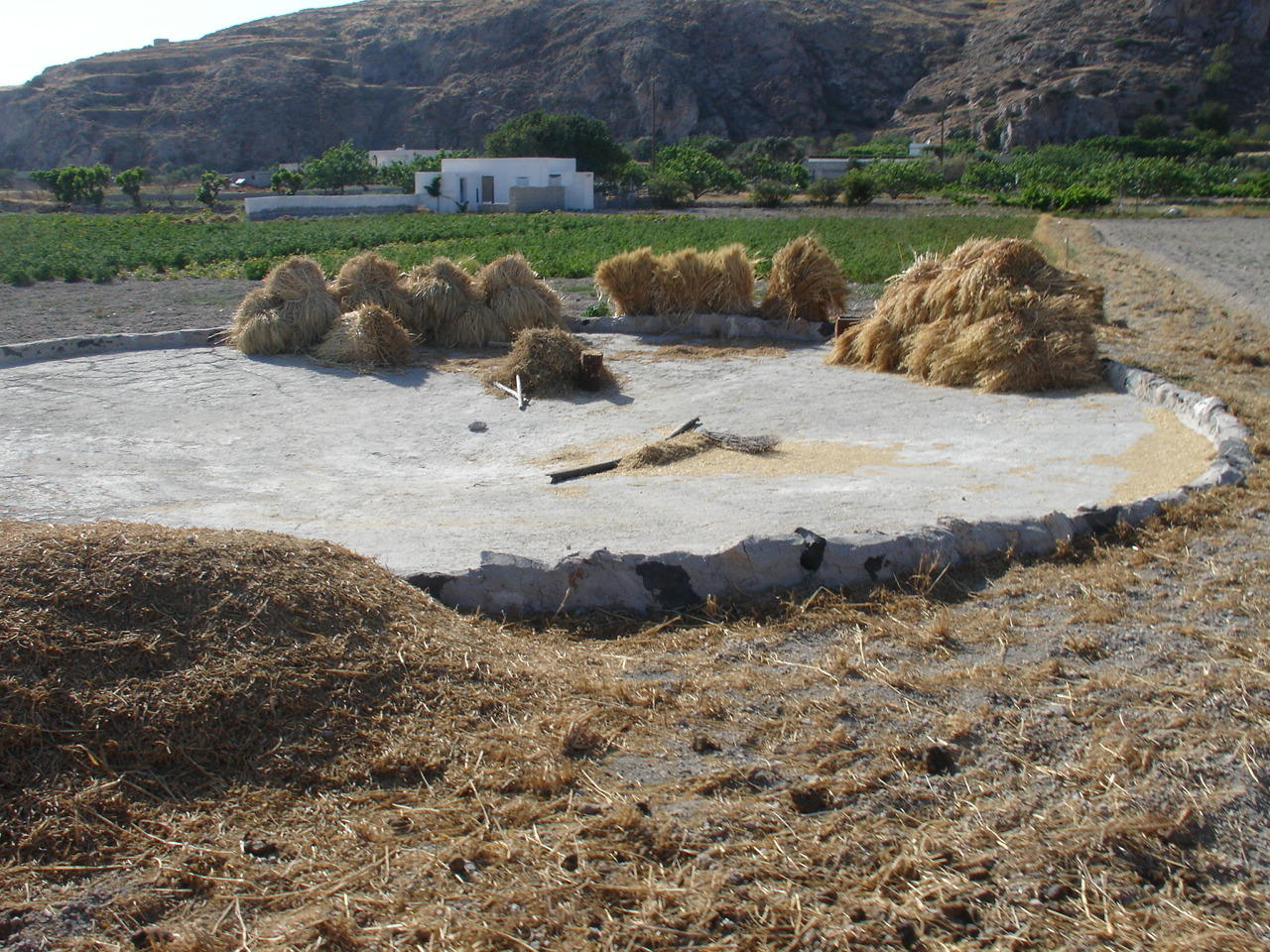
A threshing floor in Santorini in Greece

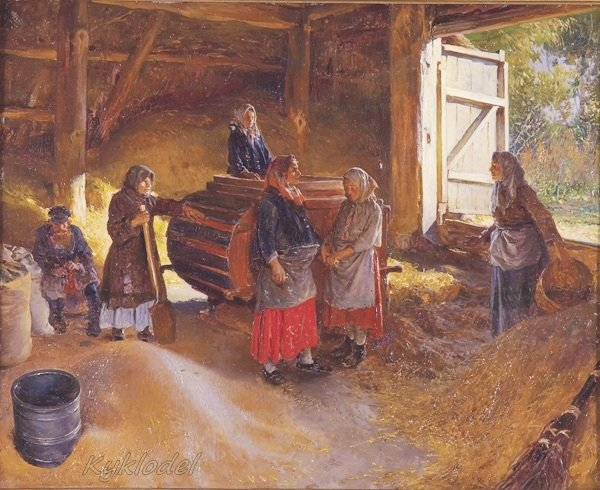
Russian women using a hand powered winnowing machine in a barn. Painting by K.V. Lebedev, The Floor, 1894.

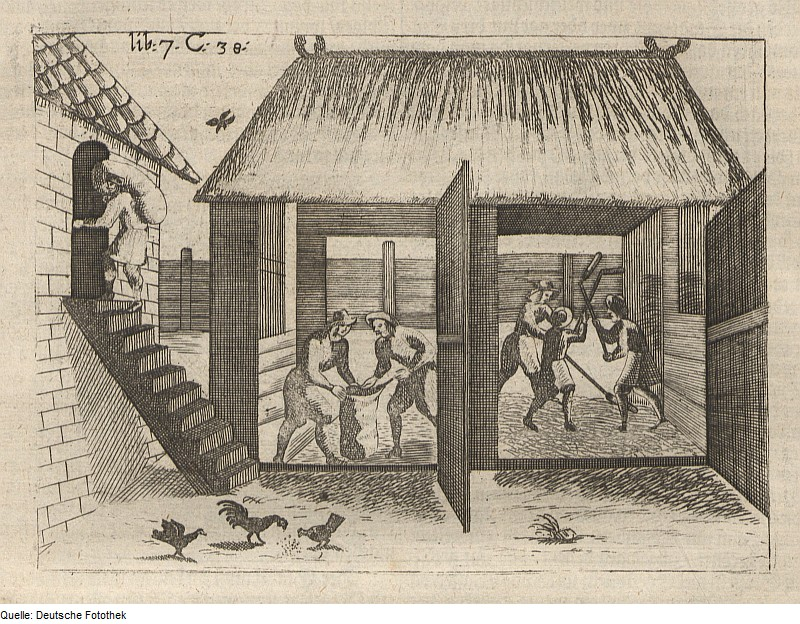
Threshing and bagging grain in Germany in 1695

Threshing (thrashing) was originally "to tramp or stamp heavily with the feet" and was later applied to the act of separating out grain by the feet of people or oxen and still later with the use of a flail. A threshing floor is of two main types: 1) a specially flattened outdoor surface, usually circular and paved, or 2) inside a building with a smooth floor of earth, stone or wood where a farmer would thresh the grain harvest and then winnow it. Animal and steam powered threshing machines from the nineteenth century onward made threshing floors obsolete. The outdoor threshing floor was either owned by the entire village or by a single family, and it was usually located outside the village in a place exposed to the wind.

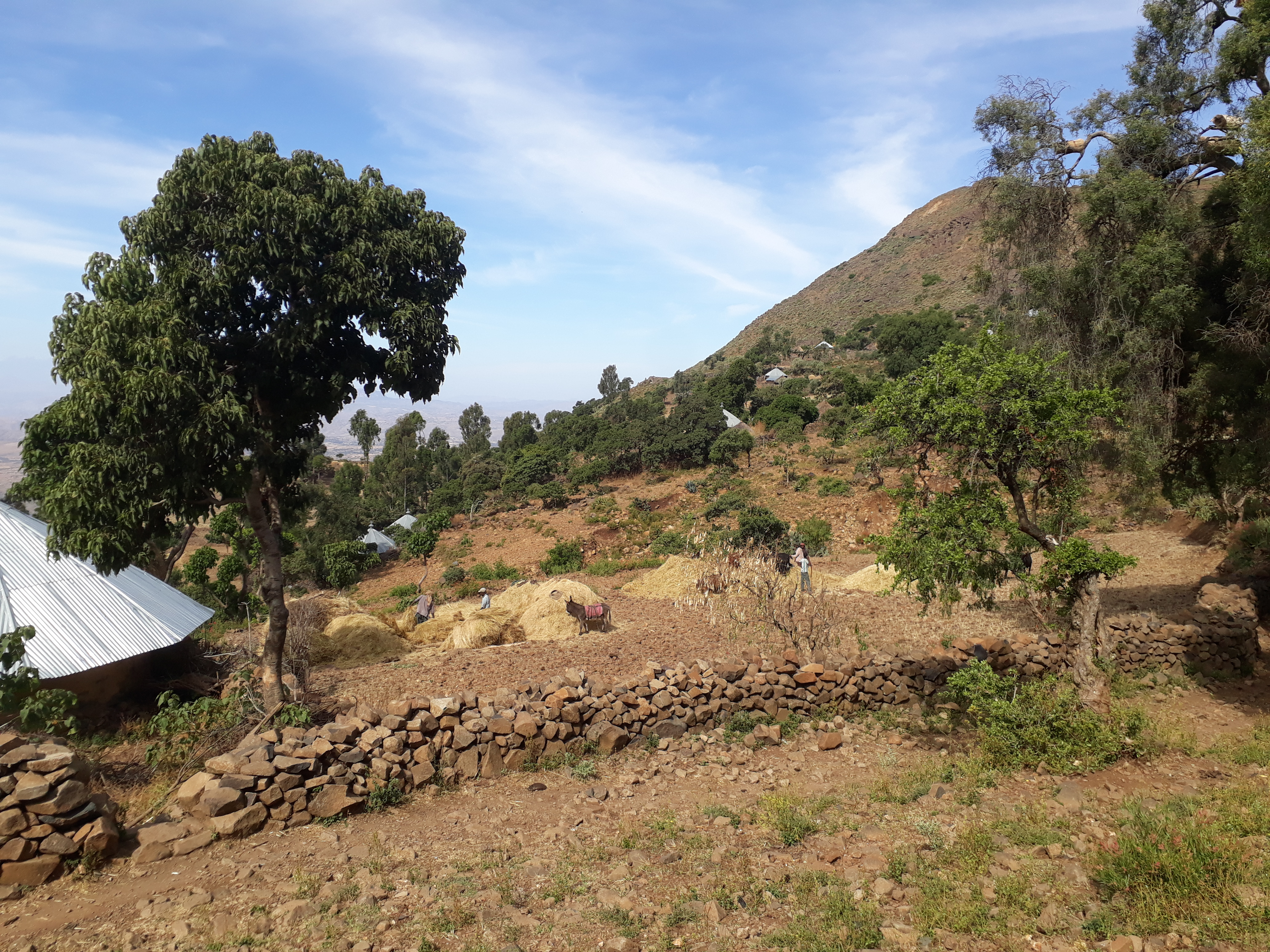
Work on the threshing floor in Gumuara (Ethiopia)

== Structure of outdoor floors ==
Outdoor threshing floors are usually located near a farm or farmhouse, or in places easily accessible from growing areas. They are usually paved with material that may be of various kinds, for example round stone cobbles about the size of a fist; slate; tile; or sometimes the underlying bedrock itself is exposed. Unpaved earthen threshing floors are also sometimes found. The floors usually have a slight slope, to avoid water standing on them after rain; and the paving may be divided by rays traced from a central focus to facilitate the pavement.

To overcome possible unevenness, and isolate them from water running off after rain so helping to preserve them, threshing floors are often surrounded by a stout low wall. The construction was often in a high place, to take advantage of soft and steady winds to facilitate the work of winnowing, separating the grain from the chaff, once the threshing had been completed.

== Structure of indoor floors ==
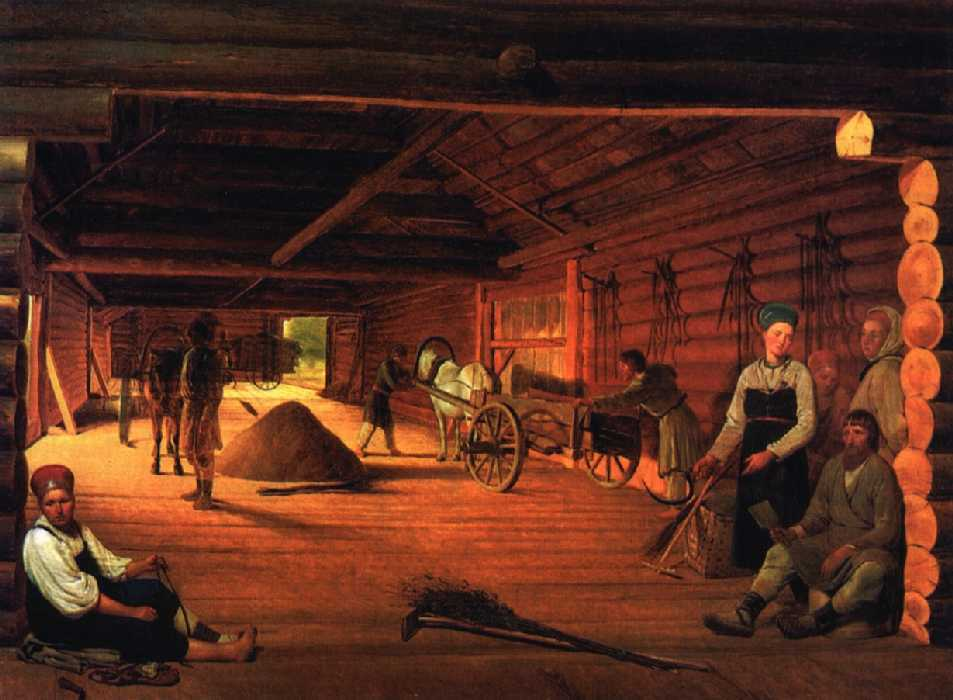
Threshing Floor by Alexey Venetsianov, 1821–1823

The central bay of a barn was the typical location of the threshing floor. Some large barns have two or even three threshing floors. The floors in barns may be packed dirt, stone, or a tightly fitted wood. To keep the grain from falling out the open doorway(s) a board was sometimes placed across the doorway called a threshold, but the term threshold was originally the floor itself or well foot-worn floor boards. Threshing in barns was mostly done by hand with a flail until threshing machines became available in the 19th century. The harvest could be stored in the barn and threshed during the winter. Barns may have a granary room or a separate granary building may have been used to store the threshed crop.

A unique barn feature in some barns in parts of the northeast United States, called a swing beam, was designed for animals to walk in circles around a pole inside the barn pulling a device to thresh the grain instead of using a flail. The farm family could use the barn to their advantage in winnowing by standing in a doorway where a slight breeze is magnified by the wind passing around the building. Some barns had smaller winnowing doors to the rear of the threshing floor to concentrate the breeze even more than the big barn doors.

== Use ==
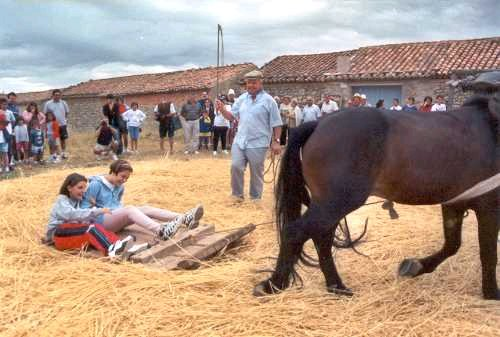
A horse pulling a threshing board on a threshing floor

Sheaves of grain would be opened up and the stalks spread across the threshing floor. Pairs of donkeys or oxen (or sometimes cattle, or horses) would then be walked round and round, often dragging a heavy threshing board behind them, to tear the ears of grain from the stalks, and loosen the grain itself from the husks.

After this threshing process, the broken stalks and grain were collected and then thrown up into the air with a wooden winnowing fork or a winnowing fan. The chaff would be blown away by the wind; the short torn straw would fall some distance away; while the heavier grain would fall at the winnower's feet. The grain could then be further cleansed by sieving.

=== Biblical references ===
The first biblical mention of the threshing floor is in Genesis 50:10. As such, it was not a shed, building, or any place covered with a roof and surrounded by walls, but a circular piece of ground from fifty to a hundred feet in diameter, in the open air, on elevated ground, and made smooth, hardy, and clean. Here the grain was threshed and winnowed.

Two apparently coincident descriptive narratives are given in 2 Samuel 24:10–25 and 1 Chronicles 21:9–30 with regard to King David's purchase of the threshing floor on Mount Moriah (as well as Mount Moriah itself). In it, the Lord's directive to Gad, King David's prophet, was to instruct David to "rear an altar unto the Lord in the threshingfloor of Araunah the Jebusite" (2 Samuel 24:18–19 and 1 Chronicles 21:18–19).
