= Orders of magnitude (temperature) =

Comparison of a wide range of temperatures

== List of orders of magnitude for temperature ==
Factor	Multiple	Item
0	0 K	Absolute zero: A temperature so low that it cannot be reached, because of the third law of thermodynamics
10^{−12}	1 pK	38+6 −7 pK, lowest laboratory-produced temperature, achieved through matter-wave lensing of rubidium Bose-Einstein condensates.; 450 pK, lowest temperature sodium Bose–Einstein condensate gas ever achieved in the laboratory, at MIT
10^{−9}	1 nK	50 nK, Fermi temperature of potassium-40; Critical temperature of alkali Bose–Einstein condensates
10^{−6}	1 μK	Nuclear demagnetization; Doppler-cooled refrigerants in laser cooling and magneto-optical traps
10^{−3}	1 mK	1.7 mK, temperature record for helium-3/helium-4 dilution refrigeration, and the lowest temperature which may be sustained for arbitrarily long time with known techniques.; 2.5 mK, Fermi melting point of helium-3; 60 mK adiabatic demagnetization of paramagnetic molecules; 300 mK in evaporative cooling of helium-3; 700 mK, helium-3/helium-4 mixtures begin phase separation; 950 mK, melting point of helium at 2.5 MPa of pressure. All 118 elements are solid at or below this temperature.; Energy equivalent to a microwave photon
1	1 K	1 K at the Boomerang Nebula, the coldest natural environment known; 1.5 K, melting point of overbound helium; 2.19 K, lambda point of overbound superfluid helium; 2.725 K, cosmic microwave background; 4.1 K, superconductivity point of mercury; 4.22 K, boiling point of bound helium; 5.19 K, critical temperature of helium; 7.2 K, superconductivity point of lead; 9.3 K, superconductivity point of niobium
10^{1}	10 K	Fermi melting point of valence electrons for superconductivity; 14.01 K, melting point of bound hydrogen; 20.28 K, boiling point of bound hydrogen; 33 K, critical temperature of hydrogen; 44 K mean on Pluto; 53 K mean of Neptune; 63 K, melting point of bound nitrogen; 68 K mean of Uranus; 77.35 K, boiling point of bound nitrogen; 90.19 K, boiling point of bound oxygen; 92 K, superconductivity point of Y–Ba–Cu–oxide (YBCO)
10^{2}	100 K	134 K, highest-temperature superconductor at ambient pressure, mercury barium calcium copper oxide; 165 K, glass transition temperature of supercooled water; 184.0 K (–89.2 °C), coldest air recorded on Earth; 192 K, Debye temperature of ice; 273.15 K (0.00 °C), melting point of bound water; 273.16 K (0.01 °C), temperature of triple point of water; c. 293 K, room temperature; 373.15 K (100.00 °C), boiling point of bound water at sea level; 647 K, critical point of superheated water; 737.5 K, mean on Venus; See detailed list below
10^{3}	1 kK	500–2200 K on brown dwarfs (photosphere); 1043 K Curie temperature of iron (point at which iron transitions from ferromagnetic to paramagnetic behavior and loses any permanent magnetism); 1170 K at wood fire; 1300 K in lava flows, open flames; 1500 K in basalt lava flows; c. 1670 K at blue candle flame; 1811 K, melting point of iron (lower for steel); 1830 K in Bunsen burner flame; 1900 K at the Space Shuttle orbiter hull in 8 km/s dive; 2022 K, boiling point of lead; 2074 K, surface temperature of the coolest star, 2MASS J0523-1403; 2230 K, Debye temperature of carbon; 2320 K at open hydrogen flame; 2150–2450 K at open hydrocarbon flame; 2900 K, color temperature of halogen lamps, black-body radiation maximum at 1000 nm; 3695 K, melting point of tungsten; 3915 K, sublimation point of carbon; 4231 K, melting point of hafnium carbide; 4800 K, 10 MPa, triple point of carbon; 5000 K, 12 GPa melting point of diamond; 5100 K in cyanogen–dioxygen flame; 5516 K at dicyanoacetylene (carbon subnitride)–ozone flame; 5650 K at Earth's Inner Core Boundary; 5780 K on surface of the Sun; 5933 K, boiling point of tungsten; 6000 K, mean of the Universe 300000 years after the Big Bang; 7445 K, 850 GPa; 8750 K, 520 GPa; 5400 K, 220 GPa, critical point of diamond/solid III; 7735 K, a monatomic ideal gas has one electron volt of kinetic energy; 8000 K, routinely sustainable temperature in an analytical inductively coupled plasma; 8801 K, 10.56 GPa; 7020.5 K, 797 MPa, critical point of carbon; Anionic sparks
10^{4}	10 kK	10 kK on Sirius A; 10–15 kK in mononitrogen recombination; 15.5 kK, critical point of tungsten; 25 kK, mean temperature of the universe 10000 years after the Big Bang; 26 kK on the white dwarf Sirius B; 28 kK in record cationic lightning over Earth; 29 kK on surface of Alnitak (easternmost star of Orion's belt); 4–8–40–160 kK on white dwarfs; 30–400 kK on a planetary nebula's asymptotic giant helium star; 36 kK boundary between inner and outer core within Jupiter; 37 kK in proton–electron reactions; 38 kK on Eta Carinae; 46 kK on Wolf–Rayet star R136a1; 50 kK at protostar (core); 54.5 kK on ON2 III(f*) star LH64-16; >200 kK in Butterfly Nebula; Fermi boiling point of valence electrons
10^{6}	1 MK	0.8 MK in solar wind; 1 MK inside old neutron stars, brown dwarfs, and at gravital deuterium fusion range; 1–3–10 MK above Sun (corona); 2.4 MK at T Tauri stars and gravital lithium-6 fusion range; 2.5 MK at red dwarfs and gravital protium fusion range; 10 MK at orange dwarfs and gravital helium-3 fusion range; 15.6 MK at Sun's core; 10–30–100 MK in stellar flares; 20 MK in novae; 23 MK, beryllium-7 fusion range; 60 MK above Eta Carinae; 85 MK (15 keV) in a magnetic confinement fusion plasma; 200 MK at helium star and gravital helium-4 fusion range; 230 MK, gravital carbon-12 fusion range; 460 MK, gravital neon fusion–disproportionation range; 5–530 MK in Tokamak Fusion Test Reactor's plasma; 750 MK, gravital oxygen fusion range
10^{9}	1 GK	1 GK, everything 100 s after the Big Bang; 1.3–1.7 GK, gravital silicon fusion range; 3 GK in electron–positron reactions; 10 GK in supernovae; 10 GK, everything 1 s after the Big Bang; 700 GK in quasars' accretion discs; 740 GK, Hagedorn temperature or Fermi melting point of pions
10^{12}	1 TK	0.1–1 TK at new neutron star; c. 1 TK, critical temperature to form quark–gluon plasma; 3–5 TK in proton–antiproton reactions; 5.5 TK, highest man-made temperature, in a quark–gluon plasma from LHC collisions; 10 TK, 100 μs after the Big Bang; 45–67 TK at collapsar of a gamma-ray burst; 300–900 TK at proton–nickel conversions in the Tevatron's Main Injector
10^{15}	1 PK	0.3–2.2 PK at proton–antiproton collisions; 2.8 PK within an electroweak star
10^{18}	1 EK	Temperature of the universe a split second after the Big Bang
10^{21}	1 ZK	Temperature of the universe 100 ns after the Big Bang
10^{24}	1 YK	0.5–7 YK at ultra-high-energy cosmic ray collisions
10^{27}	1 RK	Everything 10^{−35} s after the Big Bang
10^{30}	1 QK	Hagedorn temperature of strings
10^{32}	100 QK	142 QK, Planck temperature
10^{290}	10^{260} QK	Landau pole of quantum electrodynamics

== Detailed list for 100 K to 1000 K ==
Most ordinary human activity takes place at temperatures of this order of magnitude. Circumstances where water naturally occurs in liquid form are shaded.

Kelvin	°Celsius	°Fahrenheit	Condition
100 K	−173 °C	−280 °F	Temperature used for cryotechnics
133 K	−140 °C	−220 °F	Mean on Saturn
133 to 163 K	−140 to −110 °C	−220 to −166 °F	Typical temperature of a whole-body cryotherapy chamber
163 K	−110 °C	−166 °F	Mean on Jupiter
165 K	−108 °C	−163 °F	Glass transition temperature of supercooled water (Debatable)
175.4 K	−97.7 °C	−144.0 °F	Coldest luminance temperature recorded on Earth (measured remotely by satellite), in Antarctica
183.7 K	−89.5 °C	−129.0 °F	Freezing/melting point of isopropyl alcohol
183.9 K	−89.2 °C	−128.7 °F	Coldest officially recorded air temperature on Earth, at Vostok Station, Antarctica on 1983-07-21 01:45 UTC
192 K	−81 °C	−114 °F	Debye temperature of ice
193 to 203 K	−80 to −70 °C	−112 to −94 °F	Typical temperature of a ULT freezer
194.6 K	−78.5 °C	−109.4 °F	Sublimation point of carbon dioxide (dry ice)
203.55 K	−69.60 °C	−93.28 °F	Coldest officially recorded air temperature in the Northern Hemisphere at Klinck AWS, Greenland (Denmark) on 1991-12-22
205.5 K	−67.6 °C	−89.8 °F	Coldest officially recorded air temperature on the Eurasian continent at Oymyakon, USSR on 1933-02-06
210 K	−63 °C	−82 °F	Mean on Mars
214.9 K	−58.2 °C	−72.8 °F	Coldest annual mean temperature on Earth, at Dome Argus, Antarctica
223.15 K	−50.00 °C	−58.00 °F	Mean on Earth during Snowball Earth period around 650 million years ago
224.8 K	−48.3 °C	−55.0 °F	Coldest temperature that water can remain a liquid (see Supercooling)
225 K	−48 °C	−55 °F	Freezing/melting point of cottonseed oil
233.15 K	−40.00 °C	−40.00 °F	Point of coincidence of the Celsius and Fahrenheit temperature scales; Skin may freeze almost instantly at or below this temperature
234.3 K	−38.8 °C	−37.9 °F	Freezing/melting point of mercury
240.4 K	−32.7 °C	−27.0 °F	Coldest air temperature recorded in South America, at Sarmiento, Argentina on 1907-06-01
246 K	−27 °C	−17 °F	Approximate average yearly temperature on Mount Everest
249 K	−24 °C	−11 °F	Freezing/melting point of flax seed oil
249.3 K	−23.8 °C	−10.9 °F	Coldest air temperature recorded in Africa, at Ifrane, Morocco on 1935-02-11
250 K	−23 °C	−10 °F	Coldest air temperature recorded in Australia, at Charlotte Pass, New South Wales, Australia on 1994-06-29
255.37 K	−17.78 °C	0.00 °F	Coldest brine–ice solution found by Daniel Gabriel Fahrenheit
255 K	−18 °C	−1 °F	Freezing/melting point of almond oil; Typical temperature of a household freezer
256 K	−17 °C	1 °F	Freezing/melting point of sunflower oil
256 K	−17 °C	1 °F	Freezing/melting point of safflower oil
257 K	−16 °C	3 °F	Freezing/melting point of soybean oil
262 K	−11 °C	12 °F	Freezing/melting point of corn oil
263.15 K	−10.00 °C	14.00 °F	Freezing/melting point of canola oil; Freezing/melting point of grape seed oil
265 K	−8 °C	17 °F	White frost can form below this temperature; Freezing/melting point of hemp seed oil
265.8 K	−7.3 °C	18.8 °F	Freezing/melting point of bromine
267 K	−6 °C	21 °F	Freezing/melting point of olive oil; Freezing/melting point of sesame oil
271.15 K	−2.00 °C	28.40 °F	Average freezing/melting point of oceans, the salinity is around 3.47%.
273.14 K	−0.01 °C	31.98 °F	Maximum temperature of an object causing frostbite
273.15 K	0.00 °C	32.00 °F	Freezing/melting point of fresh water at 1 atm
273.16 K	0.01 °C	32.02 °F	Triple point of fresh water
276 K	3 °C	37 °F	Freezing/melting point of peanut oil
277 K	4 °C	39 °F	Typical temperature of a household refrigerator
277.13 K	3.98 °C	39.16 °F	Water is at maximum density
279.8 K	6.7 °C	44.0 °F	Threshold of skin numbness if skin reaches this temperature
283.2 K	10.1 °C	50.1 °F	Minimum temperature for most plant growth (see Growing degree-day)
286.9 K	13.8 °C	56.8 °F	Coldest body temperature of a human that survived accidental hypothermia (a 2-year-old boy in Racławice, Poland, on 2014-11-30)
287.6 K	14.5 °C	58.0 °F	Cold threshold of pain if skin reaches this temperature
288 K	15 °C	59 °F	Mean on Earth
291.6 K	18.5 °C	65.2 °F	Hottest temperature in Antarctica, recorded on 2020-02-06 at the Esperanza Base
294 K	21 °C	70 °F	Commonly defined value for room temperature
296 K	23 °C	73 °F	Mean on Earth during the Paleocene–Eocene Thermal Maximum about 55.8 million years ago
297 K	24 °C	75 °F	Melting/freezing point of palm kernel oil
298 K	25 °C	77 °F	Melting/freezing point of coconut oil
300 K	27 °C	80 °F	Thermoneutral temperature of an unclothed human at rest; Estimated melting/freezing point of francium
302.9 K	29.8 °C	85.5 °F	Melting/freezing point of gallium
303.15 K	30.00 °C	86.00 °F	The rate of plant growth is typically no greater above this temperature than at this temperature. (see Growing degree-day)
304 K	31 °C	88 °F	Melting/freezing point of butter, critical point for carbon dioxide
307 K	34 °C	93 °F	Autoignition temperature of white phosphorus
307.6 K	34.5 °C	94.0 °F	Hottest annual mean temperature on Earth, at Dallol, Ethiopia
308 K	35 °C	95 °F	Hypothermic body temperature for humans (see Hypothermia); Warmest sea measured, at the Red Sea; Melting/freezing point of palm oil
309.5 K	36.4 °C	97.4 °F	Average body temperature for a human
311.03 K	37.88 °C	100.18 °F	Beginnings of a fever for humans
311.8 K	38.7 °C	101.6 °F	Average body temperature for a cat
313.15 K	40.00 °C	104.00 °F	Maximum standard temperature recommended for hot tub users
315 K	42 °C	107 °F	Usually fatal human fever
317.6 K	44.5 °C	112.0 °F	Hot threshold of pain if skin reaches this temperature
319.7 K	46.6 °C	115.8 °F	Highest human fever survived (Willie Jones)
321.45 K	48.30 °C	118.94 °F	World's hottest air temperature recorded while raining, at Imperial, California, USA on 2018-07-24
322.1 K	49.0 °C	120.1 °F	Hottest air temperature recorded in South America, at Rivadavia, Argentina on 1905-12-11; Maximum safe temperature for hot water according to numeric U.S. plumbing codes; Water will cause a second-degree burn after 8 minutes and a third-degree burn after 10 minutes
323.9 K	50.8 °C	123.3 °F	Hottest air temperature recorded in the Southern Hemisphere, at Oodnadatta, Australia on 1960-02-01
329.87 K	56.72 °C	134.10 °F	Hottest measured air temperature on Earth, in Death Valley at Furnace Creek, Inyo County, California, United States of America on 1913-07-10.
333.15 K	60.00 °C	140.00 °F	Water will cause a second-degree burn in 3 seconds and a third-degree burn in 5 seconds; Average temperature of a hair dryer
336 K	63 °C	145 °F	Milk pasteurization
342 K	69 °C	156 °F	Boiling point of water on the summit of Mount Everest
343.15 K	70.00 °C	158.00 °F	Food is well done; Hot springs at which some bacteria thrive
350 K	77 °C	170 °F	Poaching of food
351.52 K	78.37 °C	173.07 °F	Boiling point of ethanol
353.15 K	80.00 °C	176.00 °F	Average temperature of a sauna
355 K	82 °C	179 °F	Recommended final rinse temperature in industrial-grade commercial dishwashers
355.6 K	82.5 °C	180.4 °F	Boiling point of isopropyl alcohol
366 K	93 °C	199 °F	Simmering of food
367 K	94 °C	201 °F	Hottest ground temperature recorded on Earth at Furnace Creek, Death Valley, California, USA on 1972-07-15
371 K	98 °C	208 °F	Freezing/melting point of sodium
373.13 K	99.98 °C	211.96 °F	Boiling point of water at 1 atm
380 K	107 °C	224 °F	Smoke point of raw safflower oil; Syrup is concentrated to 75% sugar
388 K	115 °C	239 °F	Melting/freezing point of sulfur
400 K	127 °C	260 °F	Concorde nose tip during supersonic flight; Coldest known stars in space (approximate temperature)
433.15 K	160.00 °C	320.00 °F	Syrup is concentrated to 100% sugar; Sucrose (table sugar) caramelizes
450 K	177 °C	350 °F	Mean on Mercury; Smoke point of butter; Deep frying
453.15 K	180.00 °C	356.00 °F	Popcorn pops
483 K	210 °C	410 °F	Autoignition (kindling) point of diesel fuel
491 K	218 °C	424 °F	Kindling point of paper
519 K	246 °C	475 °F	Kindling point of automotive gasoline
522 K	249 °C	480 °F	Kindling point of jet fuel (Jet A/Jet A-1)
525 K	252 °C	485 °F	Smoke point of milkfat; Kindling point of jet fuel (Jet B)
538 K	265 °C	509 °F	Smoke point of refined safflower oil
574.5875 K	301.4375 °C	574.5875 °F	Point of coincidence of the Fahrenheit and Kelvin temperature scales
600.65 K	327.50 °C	621.50 °F	Melting/freezing point of lead
647 K	374 °C	705 °F	Critical point of superheated water
693 K	420 °C	788 °F	Melting/freezing point of zinc
723.15 K	450.00 °C	842.00 °F	Kindling point of aviation gasoline
738 K	465 °C	869 °F	Mean on Venus
749 K	476 °C	889 °F	Kindling point of magnesium
773.15 K	500.00 °C	932.00 °F	Oven on self-cleaning mode
798 K	525 °C	977 °F	Draper point (the point at which nearly all objects start to glow dim red)
858 K	585 °C	1,085 °F	Kindling point of hydrogen
933.47 K	660.32 °C	1,220.58 °F	Melting/freezing point of aluminium
1,000 K	730 °C	1,340 °F	Temperature of cherry-red ember, a phase in which solid bodies glow visibly

== SI multiples ==
SI multiples of kelvin (K)
Submultiples			Multiples		
Value	SI symbol	Name	Value	SI symbol	Name
10^{−1} K	dK	decikelvin	10^{1} K	daK	decakelvin
10^{−2} K	cK	centikelvin	10^{2} K	hK	hectokelvin
10^{−3} K	mK	millikelvin	10^{3} K	kK	kilokelvin
10^{−6} K	μK	microkelvin	10^{6} K	MK	megakelvin
10^{−9} K	nK	nanokelvin	10^{9} K	GK	gigakelvin
10^{−12} K	pK	picokelvin	10^{12} K	TK	terakelvin
10^{−15} K	fK	femtokelvin	10^{15} K	PK	petakelvin
10^{−18} K	aK	attokelvin	10^{18} K	EK	exakelvin
10^{−21} K	zK	zeptokelvin	10^{21} K	ZK	zettakelvin
10^{−24} K	yK	yoctokelvin	10^{24} K	YK	yottakelvin
10^{−27} K	rK	rontokelvin	10^{27} K	RK	ronnakelvin
10^{−30} K	qK	quectokelvin	10^{30} K	QK	quettakelvin
