= Wesson cooking oil =

Brand of vegetable oil manufactured in Memphis, Tennessee, US

Wesson Oil
- Product type: Cooking oil
- Current owner: Richardson International
- Country: United States
- Introduced: 1899
- Previous owners: Southern Oil Company; Beatrice Foods; Conagra Foods
- Website: Wesson Oil

Wesson cooking oil is an American brand of vegetable oil manufactured in Memphis, Tennessee, and sold by Richardson International. Historically, Wesson was cottonseed oil, but as of 2009 the products sold under the Wesson brand are oil mixtures that may include canola oil, corn oil, soybean oil or sunflower oil.

== History ==
=== Founding ===
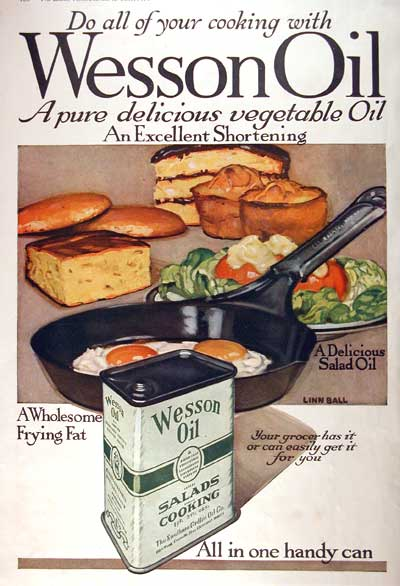
Wesson Oil advertisement, 1918

Wesson was originally a trademark of the Southern Cotton Oil Company, named after David Wesson (1861–1934), a food chemist at the firm who, in 1899 developed a novel process for deodorizing cottonseed oil, producing the first commercial all-vegetable shortenings from cottonseeds. This new product was marketed as Snowdrift. The Savannah, Georgia, factory was erected in 1911 and torn down in 2004. In the 1920s, the vegetable oil division was spun off as the Wesson Oil & Snowdrift Company. In 1960, this firm merged with Hunt's Foods, Inc. to become Hunt-Wesson Foods, which later merged with Beatrice Foods. The brand was sold to ConAgra Foods along with many other former Beatrice brands in 1990.

=== Advertising lawsuit ===
In July 2011, two lawsuits were brought against ConAgra, arguing that it misrepresented Wesson as being "pure and natural" when it used genetically modified corn and soy in its oils. They argued that ConAgra "engaged in this misleading and deceptive campaign to charge a premium and take away market share from other similar products". In March 2019 a $27 million settlement or damages and reliefs was agreed to, pending a final hearing and approval by the courts set for October 7, 2019.

=== Proposed acquisition ===
After an antitrust lawsuit filed by the Federal Trade Commission (FTC) in early March 2018, Conagra Brands Inc. and J. M. Smucker Co. cancelled a deal for Smucker to purchase the Wesson brand. The FTC claimed that Smucker would have controlled at least 70 percent of the market for branded canola and vegetable oils.

On December 18, 2018, Conagra announced that it had reached an agreement to sell Wesson to Richardson International, Limited, Canada’s largest agribusiness operating elevators, crop input facilities, canola processing and oat milling facilities in Canada, the US and Britain.

== Wesson logo and jingle ==
The Wesson logo was created by Saul Bass in 1964.

The longtime spokeswoman for Wesson cooking oil was actress Florence Henderson, Although she sang the jingle, the word "Wessonality" was actually coined by a copywriter named Mark Itkowitz at BBDO New York in 1976. His initial concept was to use the Lloyd Price version of the song "Personality". It was Jim Jordan, who was BBDO's Creative Director who suggested using the version by Johnny Mercer as the basis for the campaign. Florence Henderson appeared in television commercials for Wesson from 1974 until 1996.

== See also ==
- List of ConAgra brands
