= Pecan oil =

Oil extracted from pecan nuts

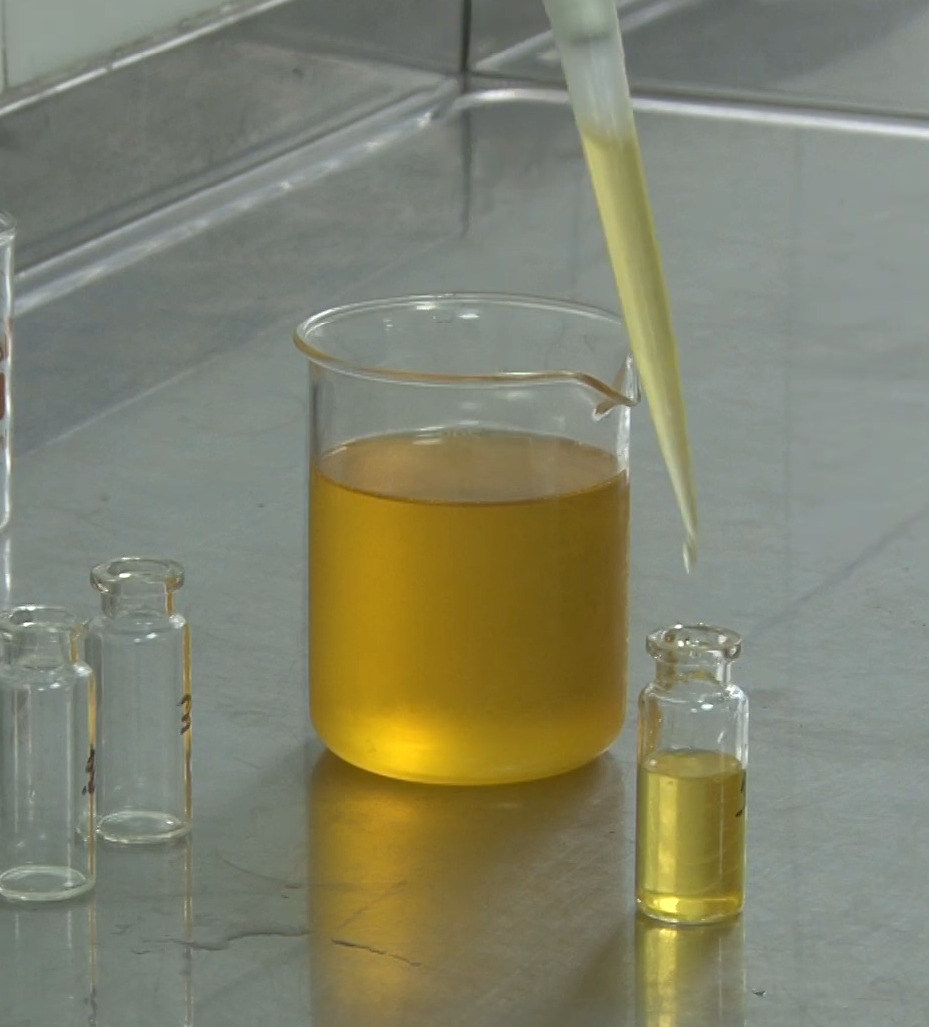
Pecan oil

Pecan oil is an edible pressed oil extracted from the pecan nut. Pecan oil is neutral in flavor and tastes of whatever seasoning is being used with it. Pecan oil contains 9.5% saturated fat, which is less than in olive oil (13.5%), peanut oil (16.90%) or corn oil (12.70%). It is also used as a massage oil and in aromatherapy applications.

Pecan oil is considered a healthy oil as it is rich in monounsaturated fats, specifically oleic acid, (52.0%) and low in saturated fats. It also contains linoleic acid (36.6%), and small amounts of palmitic (7.1%), stearic (2.2%) and linolenic acids (1.5%). The overall balance of fatty acids in the oil may reduce LDL cholesterol (also known as "bad" cholesterol) and the risk of heart disease.

The main application of this oil is its use in cooking. It has a high smoke point of 470 °F (243 °C) making it ideal for cooking at high temperatures and for deep frying. The mild nutty taste enhances the flavor of other ingredients, making it a popular component of salad dressings and dips. Pecan oil is much lighter than olive and is well suited for everyday cooking. It also generally does not contain preservatives or additives. Pecan oil is a good substitute for butter and other cooking oils, making it suitable for baking.

== Processing ==
Prior to extraction, the nuts are lightly roasted and ground. Mechanical extraction methods are then used to remove the oil. Most manufacturers avoid the use of chemical extraction methods in order to preserve the natural nutty flavor and nutrients of the oil.

== Appearance ==
Pecan oil is a lightweight oil and is usually pale yellow in color.
