= Omega−6 fatty acid =

Fatty acids where the sixth bond is double

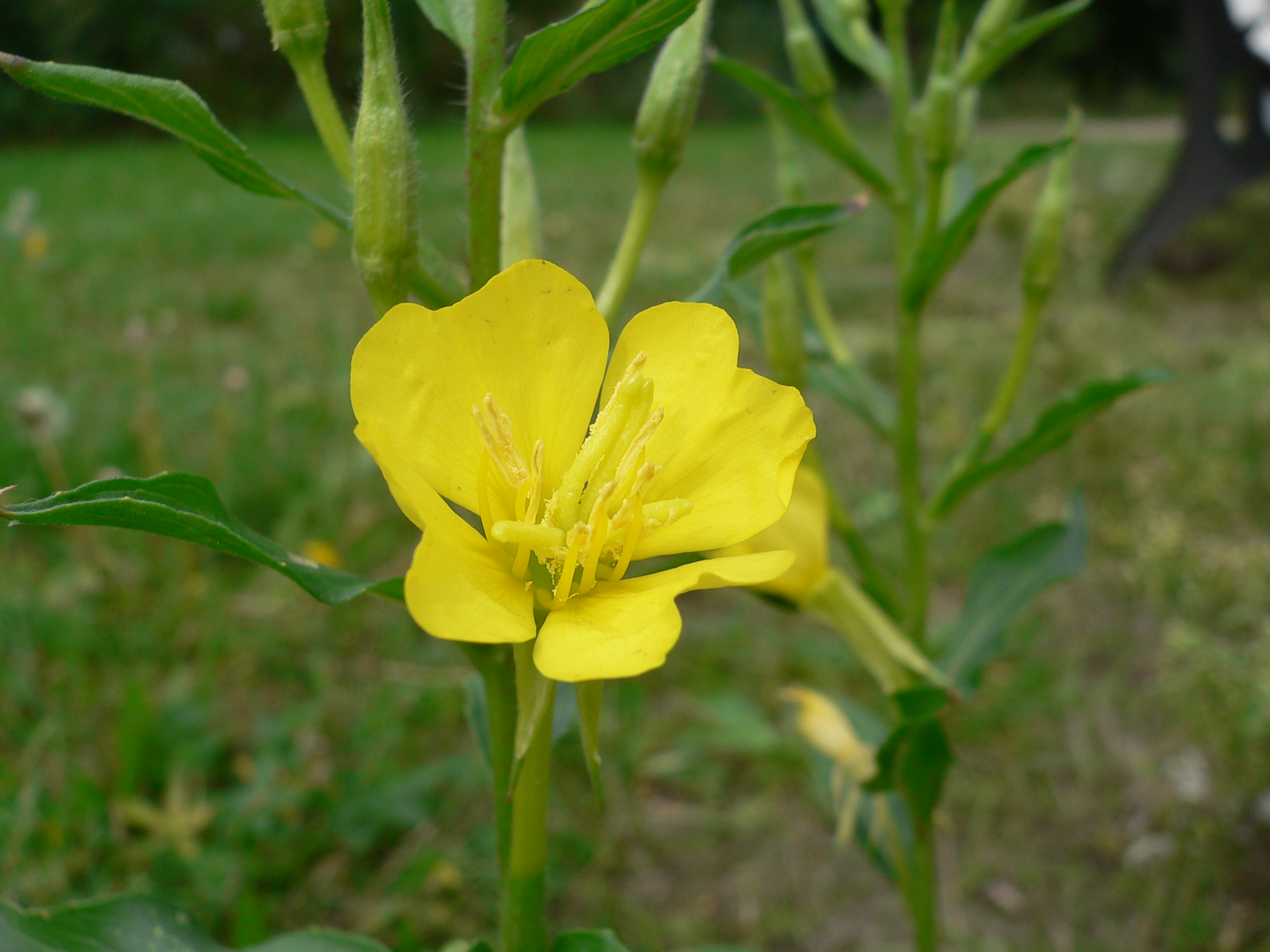
The evening primrose flower (O. biennis) produces an oil containing a high content of γ-linolenic acid, a type of omega−6 fatty acid.

Omega−6 fatty acids (also referred to as ω−6 fatty acids or n−6 fatty acids) are a family of essential polyunsaturated fatty acids (PUFA) that share a final carbon-carbon double bond in the n−6 position, that is, the sixth bond, counting from the methyl end. Health and medical organizations recommend intake of omega−6 fatty acids as part of healthful dietary patterns.

== Health effects ==
=== Cardiovascular disease ===
The American Heart Association "supports an omega-6 PUFA intake of at least 5% to 10% of energy in the context of other AHA lifestyle and dietary recommendations. To reduce omega−6 PUFA intakes from their current levels would be more likely to increase than to decrease risk for coronary heart disease."

A 2018 review found that an increased intake of omega−6 fatty acids reduces total serum cholesterol and may reduce myocardial infarction (heart attack), but found no significant change in LDL cholesterol and triglycerides. A 2021 review found that omega−6 supplements do not affect the risk of CVD morbidity and mortality.

Omega−6 fatty acids are not associated with atrial fibrillation. A scoping review for Nordic Nutrition Recommendations 2023 found that partial replacement of saturated fatty acid with omega−6 fatty acid decreases risk of cardiovascular disease and improves the blood lipid profile. A 2025 meta-analysis of 150 cohorts and meta-regression found that higher dietary intake and circulating levels of omega−6 fatty acids are associated with a lowered risk of cardiovascular disease and all-cause mortality.

=== Blood pressure ===
A 2023 review found that omega−6 polyunsaturated fatty acids are associated with a lower risk of high blood pressure.

=== Cancer ===
A 2022 meta-analysis of observational studies by the World Health Organization (WHO) found that higher intakes of omega−6 fatty acids are associated with a 9% reduced risk of all-cause mortality and a 31% increased risk of postmenopausal breast cancer. The increased risk of breast cancer has not been confirmed in randomized controlled trials. A 2025 meta-analysis found that higher dietary intake and circulating levels of omega−6 fatty acids are associated with lower cancer incidence. A 2026 meta-analysis found no significant association between higher dietary intake of omega−6 fatty acids and breast cancer risk.

== Dietary sources ==
Dietary sources of omega−6 fatty acids include:

- Bacon
- Cereals
- Corn chips
- Eggs
- Mayonnaise
- Pizza
- Poultry
- Popcorn
- Pumpkin seeds
- Salami
- Sunflower seeds
- Walnuts

=== Vegetable oils ===
Vegetable oils are a major source of omega−6 linoleic acid. Worldwide, more than 100 million metric tons of vegetable oils are extracted annually from palm fruits, soybean seeds, grape seeds, and sunflower seeds, providing more than 32 million metric tons of omega−6 linoleic acid and 4 million metric tons of omega−3 alpha-linolenic acid.

Properties of vegetable oils The nutritional values are expressed as percent (%) by mass of total fat.
Type	Processing treatment	Saturated fatty acids	Monounsaturated fatty acids		Polyunsaturated fatty acids				Smoke point
Type	Processing treatment	Saturated fatty acids	Total	Oleic acid (ω−9)	Total	α-Linolenic acid (ω−3)	Linoleic acid (ω−6)	ω−6:3 ratio	Smoke point
Avocado		11.6	70.6	67.9	13.5	1	12.5	12.5:1	250 °C (482 °F)
Brazil nut		17.6	26.7	26.1	55.7	0.1	55.6	457:1	208 °C (406 °F)
Canola		7.4	63.3	61.8	28.1	9.1	18.6	2:1	204 °C (400 °F)
Coconut		82.5	6.3	6	1.7	0.019	1.68	88:1	175 °C (347 °F)
Corn		12.9	27.6	27.3	54.7	1	58	58:1	232 °C (450 °F)
Cottonseed		25.9	17.8	19	51.9	1	54	54:1	216 °C (420 °F)
Cottonseed	hydrogenated	93.6	1.5		0.6	0.2	0.3	1.5:1	
Flaxseed/linseed		9.0	18.4	18	67.8	53	13	0.2:1	107 °C (225 °F)
Grape seed		9.6	16.1	15.8	69.9	0.10	69.6	very high	216 °C (421 °F)
Hemp seed		7.0	9.0	9.0	82.0	22.0	54.0	2.5:1	166 °C (330 °F)
High-oleic safflower oil		7.5	75.2	75.2	12.8	0	12.8	very high	212 °C (414 °F)
Olive (extra virgin)		13.8	73.0	71.3	10.5	0.7	9.8	14:1	193 °C (380 °F)
Palm		49.3	37.0	40	9.3	0.2	9.1	45.5:1	235 °C (455 °F)
Palm	hydrogenated	88.2	5.7		0				
Peanut		16.2	57.1	55.4	19.9	0.318	19.6	61.6:1	232 °C (450 °F)
Rice bran oil		25	38.4	38.4	36.6	2.2	34.4	15.6:1	232 °C (450 °F)
Sesame		14.2	39.7	39.3	41.7	0.3	41.3	138:1	
Soybean		15.6	22.8	22.6	57.7	7	51	7.3:1	238 °C (460 °F)
Soybean	partially hydrogenated	14.9	43.0	42.5	37.6	2.6	34.9	13.4:1	
Sunflower oil		8.99	63.4	62.9	20.7	0.16	20.5	128:1	227 °C (440 °F)
Walnut oil	unrefined	9.1	22.8	22.2	63.3	10.4	52.9	5:1	160 °C (320 °F)

Comparison of dietary fat composition from a 1995 study.

== List of omega−6 fatty acids ==
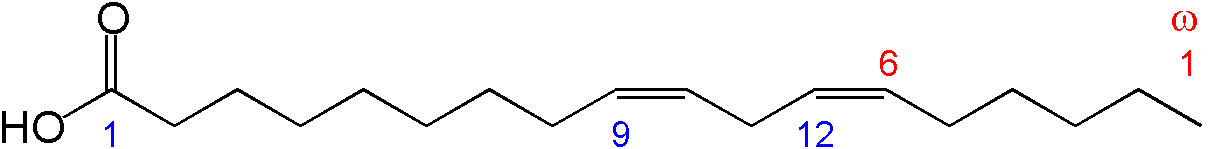
The chemical structure of linoleic acid, a common omega−6 fatty acid found in many nuts, seeds, and vegetable oils.

Common name	Lipid name	Chemical name
Linoleic acid (LA)	18:2 (n−6)	all-cis-9,12-octadecadienoic acid
Gamma-linolenic acid (GLA)	18:3 (n−6)	all-cis-6,9,12-octadecatrienoic acid
Calendic acid	18:3 (n−6)	8E,10E,12Z-octadecatrienoic acid
Eicosadienoic acid	20:2 (n−6)	all-cis-11,14-eicosadienoic acid
Dihomo-gamma-linolenic acid (DGLA)	20:3 (n−6)	all-cis-8,11,14-eicosatrienoic acid
Arachidonic acid (AA, ARA)	20:4 (n−6)	all-cis-5,8,11,14-eicosatetraenoic acid
Docosadienoic acid	22:2 (n−6)	all-cis-13,16-docosadienoic acid
Adrenic acid	22:4 (n−6)	all-cis-7,10,13,16-docosatetraenoic acid
Osbond acid	22:5 (n−6)	all-cis-4,7,10,13,16-docosapentaenoic acid
Tetracosatetraenoic acid	24:4 (n−6)	all-cis-9,12,15,18-tetracosatetraenoic acid
Tetracosapentaenoic acid	24:5 (n−6)	all-cis-6,9,12,15,18-tetracosapentaenoic acid

The melting point of the fatty acids increases as the number of carbons in the chain increases.

== See also ==
- Cattle feeding
- Essential fatty acid interactions
- Essential nutrients
- Inflammation
- Linolenic acid
- Lipid peroxidation
- Olive oil regulation and adulteration
- Omega−3 fatty acid
- Omega−7 fatty acid
- Omega−9 fatty acid
- Ratio of fatty acids in different foods
- Wheat germ oil
