= Cooking oil =

Oil used in food and cooking, of vegetable or animal origin

Cooking oil (also known as edible oil) is a plant or animal liquid fat used in frying, baking, and other types of cooking. Oil allows higher cooking temperatures than water, making cooking faster and more flavorful, while likewise distributing heat, reducing burning and uneven cooking. It sometimes imparts its own flavor. Cooking oil is also used in food preparation and flavoring not involving heat, such as salad dressings and bread dips.

Cooking oil is typically a liquid at room temperature, although some oils that contain saturated fat, such as coconut oil, palm oil and palm kernel oil, are solid.

There are a wide variety of cooking oils from plant sources, such as olive oil, palm oil, soybean oil, canola oil (rapeseed oil), corn oil, peanut oil, sesame oil, sunflower oil and other vegetable oils, as well as animal-based oils like butter, ghee, schmaltz, and lard.

Oil can be flavored with aromatic foodstuffs such as herbs, chilies or garlic. Cooking spray is an aerosol of cooking oil.

== Health and nutrition ==
Cost comparison of oils and fats compared to other food groups, 2021

While consumption of small amounts of saturated fats is common in diets, meta-analyses found a significant correlation between high consumption of saturated fats and blood LDL concentration, a risk factor for cardiovascular diseases. Other meta-analyses based on cohort studies and on controlled, randomized trials found a positive, or neutral, effect from consuming polyunsaturated fats instead of saturated fats (a 10% lower risk for 5% replacement).

Mayo Clinic has highlighted certain oils that are high in saturated fats, including coconut, palm oil and palm kernel oil. Those having lower amounts of saturated fats and higher levels of unsaturated (preferably omega-3) fats like olive oil, peanut oil, canola oil, soy and cottonseed oils are generally healthier. The US National Heart, Lung and Blood Institute urged saturated fats be replaced with polyunsaturated and monounsaturated fats, listing olive and canola oils as sources of healthier monounsaturated oils while soybean and sunflower oils as good sources of polyunsaturated fats. One study showed that consumption of non-hydrogenated unsaturated oils like soybean and sunflower is preferable to the consumption of palm oil for lowering the risk of heart disease.

Cashew oil and other nut-based oils do not present a danger to persons with a nut allergy, because oils are primarily lipids, and allergic reactions are due to surface proteins on the nut.

The seeds of most cultivated plants contain higher levels of omega-6 fatty acids than omega-3, with some notable exceptions. Growth at colder temperatures tends to result in higher levels of omega-3 fatty acids in seed oils.

=== Trans fats ===
Unlike other dietary fats, trans fats are not essential, and they do not promote good health. The consumption of trans fats increases one's risk of coronary heart disease by raising levels of LDL cholesterol and lowering levels of HDL cholesterol. Trans fats from partially hydrogenated oils are more harmful than naturally occurring oils.

Several large studies indicate a link between the consumption of high amounts of trans fat and coronary heart disease, and possibly some other diseases. The United States Food and Drug Administration (FDA), the National Heart, Lung and Blood Institute and the American Heart Association (AHA) all have recommended limiting the intake of trans fats. In the US, trans fats are no longer "generally recognized as safe", and cannot be added to foods, including cooking oils, without special permission.

=== Cooking with oil ===
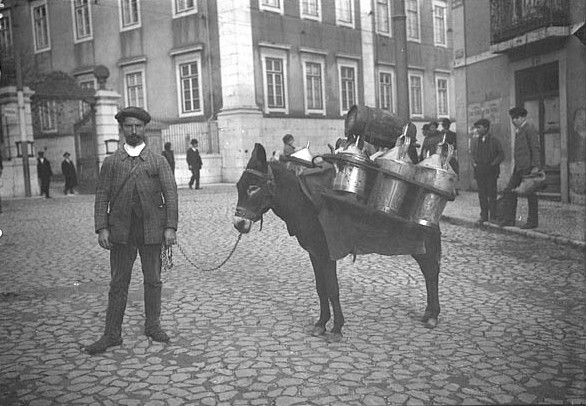
Lisbon oil merchant, c. 1900.

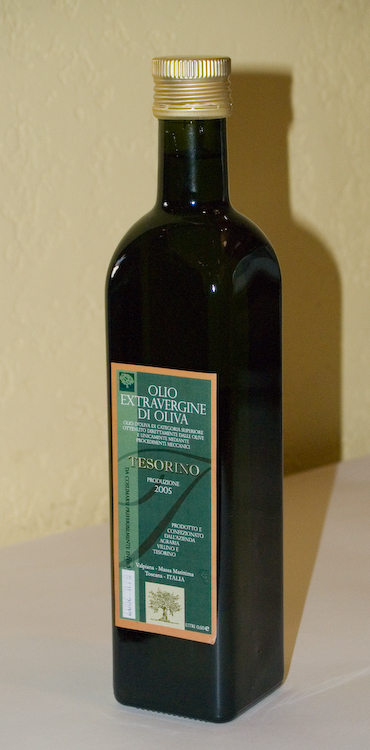
Olive oil

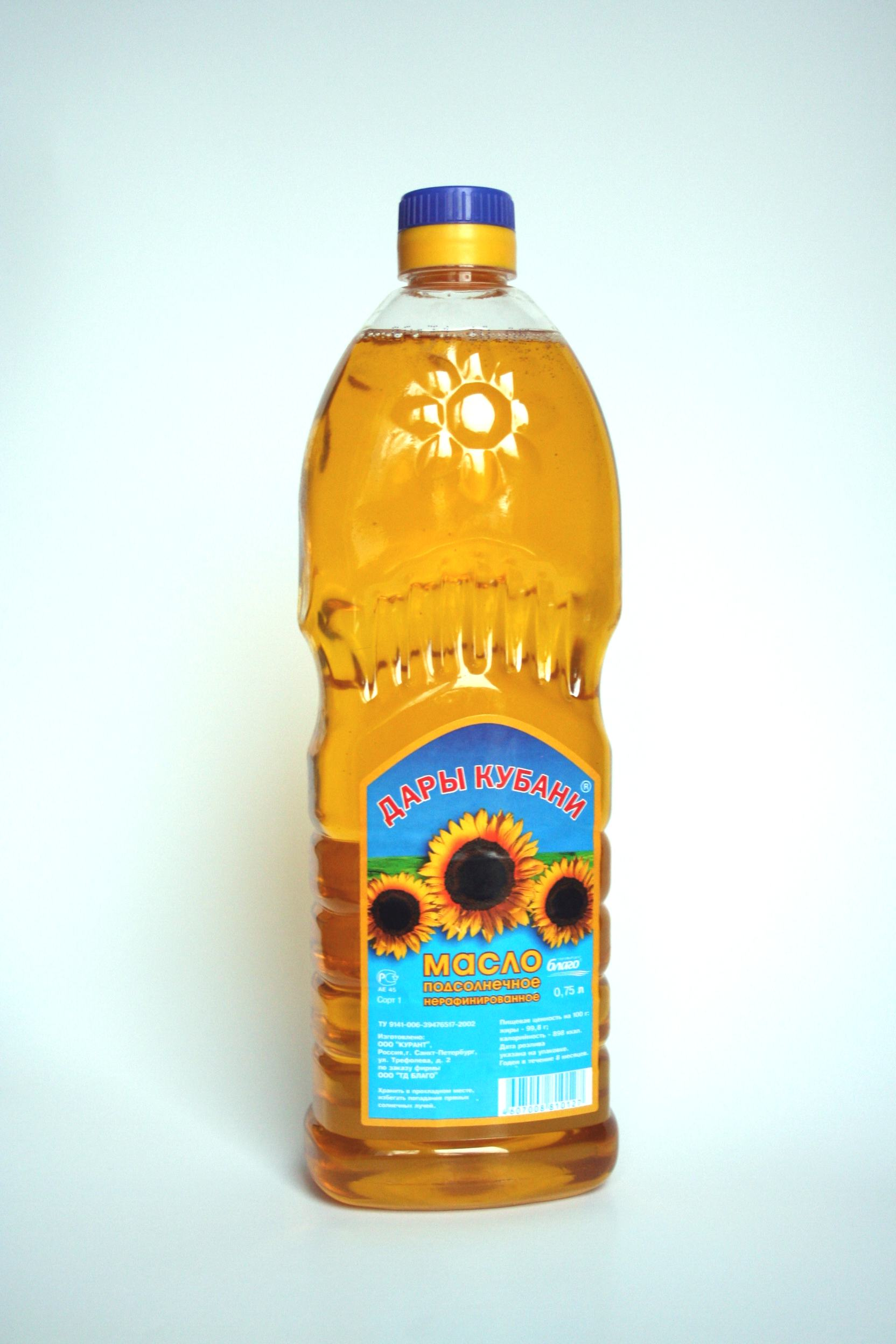
Sunflower seed oil

Heating, as well as heating vessels rapidly change characteristics of cooking oil. Oils that are healthy at room temperature can become unhealthy when heated above certain temperatures, especially when heating repeatedly. The toxic risk is linked to oxidation of fatty acids and fatty acids with higher levels of unsaturation are oxidized more rapidly during heating in air. So, when choosing a cooking oil, it is important to match the oil's heat tolerance with the temperature which will be used. and to change frying oil a few times per week. Deep-fat frying temperatures are commonly in the range of 170–190 °C (338–374 °F), less commonly, lower temperatures ≥ 130 °C (266 °F) are used.

Palm oil contains more saturated fats than canola oil, corn oil, linseed oil, soybean oil, safflower oil, and sunflower oil. Therefore, palm oil can withstand deep frying at higher temperatures and is resistant to oxidation compared to high-polyunsaturated vegetable oils. Since the 1900s, palm oil has been increasingly added into food by the global commercial food industry because it remains stable in deep frying, or in baking at very high temperatures, and for its high levels of natural antioxidants, though the refined palm oil used in industrial food has lost most of its carotenoid content (and its orange-red color).

The following oils are suitable for high-temperature frying due to their high smoke point:

- Avocado oil
- Mustard oil
- Palm oil
- Peanut oil (marketed as "groundnut oil" in the UK and India)
- Rice bran oil
- Safflower oil
- Olive oil
- Semi-refined sesame oil
- Semi-refined sunflower oil

Less aggressive frying temperatures are frequently used. A quality frying oil has a bland flavor, at least 200 °C (392 °F) smoke and 315 °C (599 °F) flash points, with maximums of 0.1% free fatty acids and 3% linolenic acid. Those oils with higher linolenic fractions are avoided due to polymerization or gumming marked by increases in viscosity with age. Olive oil resists thermal degradation and has been used as a frying oil for thousands of years.

=== Storing and keeping oil ===
All oils degrade in response to heat, light, and oxygen. To delay the onset of rancidity, a blanket of an inert gas, usually nitrogen, is applied to the vapor space in the storage container immediately after production – a process called tank blanketing.

In a cool, dry place, oils have greater stability, but may thicken, although they will soon return to liquid form if they are left at room temperature. To minimize the degrading effects of heat and light, oils should be removed from cold storage just long enough for use.

Refined oils high in monounsaturated fats, such as macadamia oil, keep up to a year, while those high in polyunsaturated fats, such as soybean oil, keep about six months. Rancidity tests have shown that the shelf life of walnut oil is about 3 months, a period considerably shorter than the best before date shown on labels.

By contrast, oils high in saturated fats, such as avocado oil, have relatively long shelf lives and can be safely stored at room temperature, as the low polyunsaturated fat content facilitates stability.

== Types and characteristics ==
Cooking oils are composed of various fractions of fatty acids. For the purpose of frying food, oils high in monounsaturated or saturated fats are generally popular, while oils high in polyunsaturated fats are less desirable. High oleic acid oils include almond, macadamia, olive, pecan, pistachio, and high-oleic cultivars of safflower and sunflower.

=== Smoke point ===
The smoke point is marked by "a continuous wisp of smoke". It is the temperature at which an oil starts to burn, leading to a burnt flavor in the foods being prepared and degradation of nutrients and phytochemicals characteristic of the oil.

Above the smoke point are flash and fire points. The flash point is the temperature at which oil vapors will ignite but are not produced in sufficient quantities to stay lit. The flash point generally occurs at about 275–330 °C (527–626 °F). The fire point is the temperature at which hot oil produces sufficient vapors they will catch on fire and burn. As frying hours increase, all these temperature points decrease. They depend more on an oil's acidity than fatty-acid profile.

The smoke point of cooking oils varies generally in association with how oil is refined: a higher smoke point results from removal of impurities and free fatty acids. Residual solvent remaining from the refining process may decrease the smoke point. It has been reported to increase with the inclusion of antioxidants (BHA, BHT, and TBHQ). For these reasons, the published smoke points of oils may vary.

| Fat | Quality | Smoke point (Note: Specified smoke, fire, and flash points of any fat and oil can be misleading: they depend almost entirely upon the free fatty acid content, which increases during storage or use. The smoke point of fats and oils decreases when they are at least partially split into free fatty acids and glycerol; the glycerol portion decomposes to form acrolein, which is the major source of the smoke evolved from heated fats and oils. A partially hydrolyzed oil therefore smokes at a lower temperature than non-hydrolyzed oil. (Adapted from Gunstone, Frank D., ed. (17 March 2011). Vegetable Oils in Food Technology: Composition, Properties and Uses. Wiley, Inc. OCLC 1083187382.)) | |
|---|---|---|---|
| Almond oil | | 221 °C | 430 °F |
| Avocado oil | Refined | 271 °C | 520 °F |
| Avocado oil | Virgin (unrefined) | 200 °C | 392 °F |
| Avocado oil | Extra virgin (unrefined) | 250 °C | 482 °F |
| Beef tallow | | 250 °C | 480 °F |
| Butter | Unrefined | 150 °C | 302 °F |
| Butter, clarified (ghee) | Clarified | 250 °C | 482 °F |
| Castor oil | Refined | 200 °C | 392 °F |
| Coconut oil | Refined, dry | 204 °C | 400 °F |
| Coconut oil | Unrefined, dry expeller pressed, virgin | 177 °C | 350 °F |
| Corn oil | | 230–238 °C | 446–460 °F |
| Corn oil | Unrefined | 178 °C | 352 °F |
| Cottonseed oil | Refined, bleached, deodorized | 220–230 °C | 428–446 °F |
| Flaxseed oil | Unrefined | 107 °C | 225 °F |
| Grapeseed oil | | 216 °C | 421 °F |
| Lard | | 190 °C | 374 °F |
| Mustard oil | | 250 °C | 480 °F |
| Olive oil | Refined | 199–243 °C | 390–470 °F |
| Olive oil | Virgin | 210 °C | 410 °F |
| Olive oil | Extra virgin, low acidity, high quality | 207 °C | 405 °F |
| Olive oil | Extra virgin | 190 °C | 374 °F |
| Palm oil | Fractionated | 235 °C | 455 °F |
| Peanut oil | Refined | 232 °C | 450 °F |
| Peanut oil | | 227–229 °C | 441–445 °F |
| Peanut oil | Unrefined | 160 °C | 320 °F |
| Pecan oil | | 243 °C | 470 °F |
| Rapeseed oil (Canola) | | 220–230 °C | 428–446 °F |
| Rapeseed oil (Canola) | Expeller press (unrefined) | 190–232 °C | 375–450 °F |
| Rapeseed oil (Canola) | Refined | 204 °C | 400 °F |
| Rice bran oil | Refined | 232 °C | 450 °F |
| Safflower oil | Unrefined | 107 °C | 225 °F |
| Safflower oil | Semirefined | 160 °C | 320 °F |
| Safflower oil | Refined | 266 °C | 510 °F |
| Sesame oil | Unrefined | 177 °C | 350 °F |
| Sesame oil | Semirefined | 232 °C | 450 °F |
| Soybean oil | | 234 °C | 453 °F |
| Sunflower oil | Neutralized, dewaxed, bleached & deodorized | 252–254 °C | 486–489 °F |
| Sunflower oil | Semirefined | 232 °C | 450 °F |
| Sunflower oil | | 227 °C | 441 °F |
| Sunflower oil | Unrefined, first cold-pressed, raw | 107 °C | 225 °F |
| Sunflower oil, high oleic | Refined | 232 °C | 450 °F |
| Sunflower oil, high oleic | Unrefined | 160 °C | 320 °F |
| Vegetable oil blend | Refined | 220 °C | 428 °F |

Oils are extracted from nuts, seeds, olives, grains or legumes by extraction using industrial chemicals or by mechanical processes. Expeller pressing is a chemical-free process that collects oils from a source using a mechanical press with minimal heat. Cold-pressed oils are extracted under a controlled temperature setting usually below 105 °C (221 °F) intended to preserve naturally occurring phytochemicals, such as polyphenols, tocotrienols, plant sterols and vitamin E which collectively affect color, flavor, aroma and nutrient value.

| Type of oil or fat | SFA | MUFA | PUFA | Omega- | | Smoke point | Uses |
| Type of oil or fat | | | | 3 | 6 | Smoke point | Uses |
|---|---|---|---|---|---|---|---|
| Almond | 8% | 66% | 26% | 0 | 17% | 221 °C (430 °F) | Baking, sauces, flavoring |
| Avocado oil | 12% | 74% | 14% | 0.95% | 12% | 271 °C (520 °F) | Frying, sautéing, dipping oil, salad oil |
| Butter | 66% | 30% | 4% | 0.3% | 2.7% | 150 °C (302 °F) | Cooking, baking, condiment, sauces, flavoring |
| Butter, clarified, Ghee | 65% | 32% | 3% | 0 | 0 | 190–250 °C (374–482 °F) | Deep frying, cooking, sautéing, condiment, flavoring |
| Canola oil | 6% | 62% | 32% | 9.1% | 18% | 225 °C (437 °F) | Frying, baking, salad dressings |
| Coconut oil (virgin) | 92% | 6% | 2% | 0 | 1.8% | 177 °C (351 °F) | Cooking, tropical cuisine, beauty products |
| Corn oil | 13% | 25% | 62% | 1.1% | 53% | 235 °C (455 °F) | Frying, baking, salad dressings, margarine, shortening |
| Cottonseed oil | 24% | 26% | 50% | 0.2% | 50% | 216 °C (421 °F) | Margarine, shortening, salad dressings, commercially fried products |
| Diacylglycerol (DAG) oil | 3.05% | 37.95% | 59% | 0 | - | 215 °C (419 °F) | Frying, baking, salad oil |
| Linseed oil | 11% | 21% | 68% | 53% | 13% | 107 °C (225 °F) | Salad dressings, nutritional supplement |
| Grapeseed oil | 12% | 17% | 71% | 0.1% | 69% | 204 °C (399 °F) | Cooking, salad dressings, margarine |
| Hemp oil | 9% | 12% | 79% | 18% | 55% | 165 °C (329 °F) | Cooking, salad dressings |
| Lard | 41% | 47% | 2% | 1% | 10% | 183–205 °C (361–401 °F) | Baking, frying |
| Macadamia oil | 12.5% | 84% | 3.5% | 0 | 2.8% | 210 °C (410 °F) | Cooking, frying, deep frying, salads, dressings. A slightly nutty odour. |
| Margarine (hard) | 80% | 14% | 6% | 2% | 22% | 150 °C (302 °F) | Cooking, baking, condiment |
| Margarine (soft) | 20% | 47% | 33% | 2.4% | 23% | 150–160 °C (302–320 °F) | Cooking, baking, condiment |
| Mustard oil | 13% | 60% | 21% | 5.9% | 15% | 254 °C (489 °F) | Cooking, frying, deep frying, salads, dressings. Very clean flavoured & palatable. |
| Olive oil (extra virgin) | 14% | 73% | 11% | 0.7% | 9.8% | 190 °C (374 °F) | Cooking, salad oils, margarine |
| Olive oil (virgin) | 14% | 73% | 11% | 0.7% | 9.8% | 215 °C (419 °F) | Cooking, salad oils, margarine |
| Olive oil (refined) | 14% | 73% | 11% | 0 | 0 | 225 °C (437 °F) | Sautee, stir frying, deep frying, cooking, salad oils, margarine |
| Olive oil (extra light) | 14% | 73% | 11% | 0 | 0 | 242 °C (468 °F) | Sautee, stir frying, frying, deep frying, cooking, salad oils, margarine |
| Palm oil | 52% | 38% | 10% | 0.2% | 9.1% | 230 °C (446 °F) | Frying, cooking, flavoring, vegetable oil, shortening |
| Peanut oil | 18% | 49% | 33% | 0 | 31% | 231 °C (448 °F) | Frying, cooking, salad oils, margarine, deep frying |
| Pumpkin seed oil | 8% | 36% | 57% | 0% | 64% | 121 °C (250 °F) | Salad oils |
| Rice bran oil | 20% | 47% | 33% | 1.6% | 33% | 213 °C (415 °F) | Cooking, frying, deep frying, salads, dressings. Very clean flavoured & palatable. |
| Safflower oil (high oleic) | 6% | 75% | 13% | | | 242 °C (468 °F) | Frying, cooking |
| Safflower oil (linoleic) | 6% | 14% | 75% | | | 242 °C (468 °F) | Cooking, salad dressings, margarine |
| Sesame oil (unrefined) | 14% | 43% | 43% | 0.3 | 41% | 177 °C (351 °F) | Cooking |
| Sesame oil (semi-refined) | 14% | 43% | 43% | 0.3 | 41% | 232 °C (450 °F) | Cooking, deep frying |
| Soybean oil | 15% | 24% | 61% | 6.7% | 50% | 240 °C (464 °F) | Cooking, salad dressings, vegetable oil, margarine, shortening |
| Sunflower oil (high oleic, refined) | 9% | 82% | 9% | 0.2% | 3.6% | 244 °C (471 °F) | Frying, cooking |
| Sunflower oil (linoleic, refined) | 11% | 20% | 69% | 0% | 56% | 240 °C (464 °F) | Cooking, salad dressings, margarine, shortening |
| Sunflower oil (mid-oleic, refined, NuSun) | 9% | 65% | 26% | | | 211 °C (412 °F) | Commercial food manufacturing |
| Tea seed oil | 22% | 60% | 18% | 0.7% | 22% | 252 °C (486 °F) | Cooking, salad dressings, stir frying, frying, margarine |
| Tallow | 43% | 50% | 4% | 1% | 3% | 249 °C (480 °F) | Cooking, shortening, pemmican, deep frying |
| Walnut oil (semi-refined) | 9% | 23% | 63% | 10% | 53% | 204 °C (399 °F) | Salad dressings, added to cold dishes to enhance flavor |

=== Comparison to other types of food ===
Fat composition in different foods

Fat composition as weight percentage of total fat
| Food | Saturated (%) | Mono- unsaturated (%) | Poly- unsaturated (%) |
Cooking oils
| Algal oil | 4 | 92 | 4 |
| Canola | 8 | 64 | 28 |
| Coconut oil | 87 | 13 | 0 |
| Corn oil | 13 | 24 | 59 |
| Cottonseed oil | 27 | 19 | 54 |
| Olive oil | 14 | 73 | 11 |
| Palm kernel oil | 86 | 12 | 2 |
| Palm oil | 51 | 39 | 10 |
| Peanut oil | 17 | 46 | 32 |
| Rice bran oil | 25 | 38 | 37 |
| Safflower oil, high oleic | 6 | 75 | 14 |
| Safflower oil, linoleic | 6 | 14 | 75 |
| Soybean oil | 15 | 24 | 58 |
| Sunflower oil | 11 | 20 | 69 |
| Mustard oil | 11 | 59 | 21 |
Dairy products
| Butterfat | 66 | 30 | 4 |
| Cheese, regular | 64 | 29 | 3 |
| Cheese, light | 60 | 30 | 0 |
| Ice cream, gourmet | 62 | 29 | 4 |
| Ice cream, light | 62 | 29 | 4 |
| Milk, whole | 62 | 28 | 4 |
| Milk, 2% | 62 | 30 | 0 |
| Whipping cream* | 66 | 26 | 5 |
Meats
| Beef | 33 | 38 | 5 |
| Ground sirloin | 38 | 44 | 4 |
| Pork chop | 35 | 44 | 8 |
| Ham | 35 | 49 | 16 |
| Chicken breast | 29 | 34 | 21 |
| Chicken | 34 | 23 | 30 |
| Turkey breast | 30 | 20 | 30 |
| Turkey drumstick | 32 | 22 | 30 |
| Fish, orange roughy | 23 | 15 | 46 |
| Salmon | 28 | 33 | 28 |
| Hot dog, beef | 42 | 48 | 5 |
| Hot dog, turkey | 28 | 40 | 22 |
| Burger, fast food | 36 | 44 | 6 |
| Cheeseburger, fast food | 43 | 40 | 7 |
| Breaded chicken sandwich | 20 | 39 | 32 |
| Grilled chicken sandwich | 26 | 42 | 20 |
| Sausage, Polish | 37 | 46 | 11 |
| Sausage, turkey | 28 | 40 | 22 |
| Pizza, sausage | 41 | 32 | 20 |
| Pizza, cheese | 60 | 28 | 5 |
Nuts
| Almonds dry roasted | 9 | 65 | 21 |
| Cashews dry roasted | 20 | 59 | 17 |
| Macadamia dry roasted | 15 | 79 | 2 |
| Peanut dry roasted | 14 | 50 | 31 |
| Pecans dry roasted | 8 | 62 | 25 |
| Flaxseeds, ground | 8 | 23 | 65 |
| Sesame seeds | 14 | 38 | 44 |
| Soybeans | 14 | 22 | 57 |
| Sunflower seeds | 11 | 19 | 66 |
| Walnuts dry roasted | 9 | 23 | 63 |
Sweets and baked goods
| Candy, chocolate bar | 59 | 33 | 3 |
| Candy, fruit chews | 14 | 44 | 38 |
| Cookie, oatmeal raisin | 22 | 47 | 27 |
| Cookie, chocolate chip | 35 | 42 | 18 |
| Cake, yellow | 60 | 25 | 10 |
| Pastry, Danish | 50 | 31 | 14 |
Fats added during cooking or at the table
| Butter, stick | 63 | 29 | 3 |
| Butter, whipped | 62 | 29 | 4 |
| Margarine, stick | 18 | 39 | 39 |
| Margarine, tub | 16 | 33 | 49 |
| Margarine, light tub | 19 | 46 | 33 |
| Lard | 39 | 45 | 11 |
| Shortening | 25 | 45 | 26 |
| Chicken fat | 30 | 45 | 21 |
| Beef fat | 41 | 43 | 3 |
| Goose fat | 33 | 55 | 11 |
| Dressing, blue cheese | 16 | 54 | 25 |
| Dressing, light Italian | 14 | 24 | 58 |
Other
| Egg yolk fat | 36 | 44 | 16 |
| Avocado | 16 | 71 | 13 |
Unless else specified in boxes, then reference is:
* 3% is trans fats

== Extraction and refinement ==
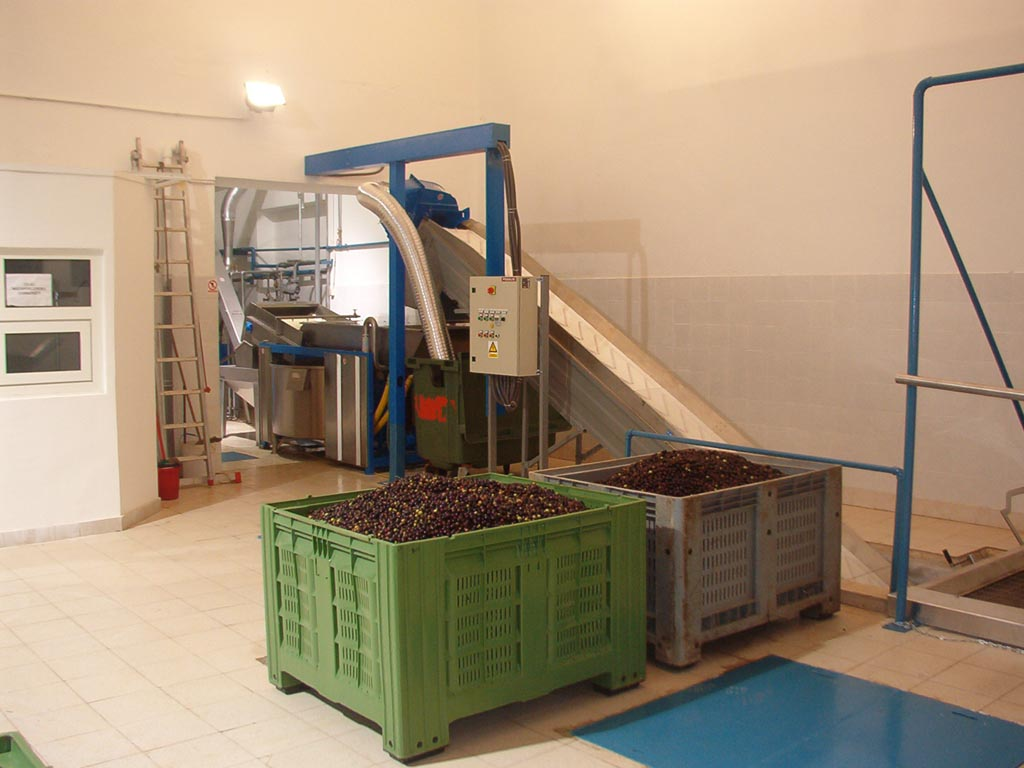
Olive oil production in Croatia

Cooking oil extraction and refinement are separate processes. Extraction first removes the oil, typically from a seed, nut or fruit. Refinement then alters the appearance, texture, taste, smell, or stability of the oil to meet buyer expectations.

=== Extraction ===
There are three broad types of oil extraction:

- Chemical solvent extraction, most commonly using hexane.
- Pressing, using an expeller press or cold press (pressing at low temperatures to prevent oil heating).
- Decanter centrifuge.

In large-scale industrial oil extraction, combinations of pressing, chemical extraction and/or centrifuging are used in order to extract the maximum amount of oil possible.

=== Refinement ===
Cooking oil can either be unrefined, or refined using one or more of the following refinement processes (in any combination):

- Distilling, which heats the oil to evaporate off chemical solvents from the extraction process.
- Degumming, by passing hot water through the oil to precipitate out gums and proteins that are soluble in water but not in oil, then discarding the water along with the impurities.
- Neutralization, or deacidification, which treats the oil with sodium hydroxide or sodium carbonate to pull out free fatty acids, phospholipids, pigments, and waxes.
- Bleaching, which removes "off-colored" components by treatment with fuller's earth, activated carbon, or activated clays, followed by heating, filtering, then drying to recoup the oil.
- Dewaxing, or winterizing, improves clarity of oils intended for refrigeration by dropping them to low temperatures and removing any solids that form.
- Deodorizing, by treating with high-heat pressurized steam to evaporate less stable compounds that might cause "unusual" odors or tastes.
- Preservative addition, including antioxidants such as BHA, BHT, and tocopherol to help preserve oils that have been made less stable due to high-temperature processing.

Filtering, a non-chemical process which screens out larger particles, could be considered a step in refinement, although it does not alter the state of the oil.

Most large-scale commercial cooking oil refinement will involve all of these steps in order to achieve a product that's uniform in taste, smell and appearance, and has a longer shelf life. Cooking oil intended for the health food market will often be unrefined, which can result in a less stable product but minimizes exposure to high temperatures and chemical processing.

== Waste cooking oil ==
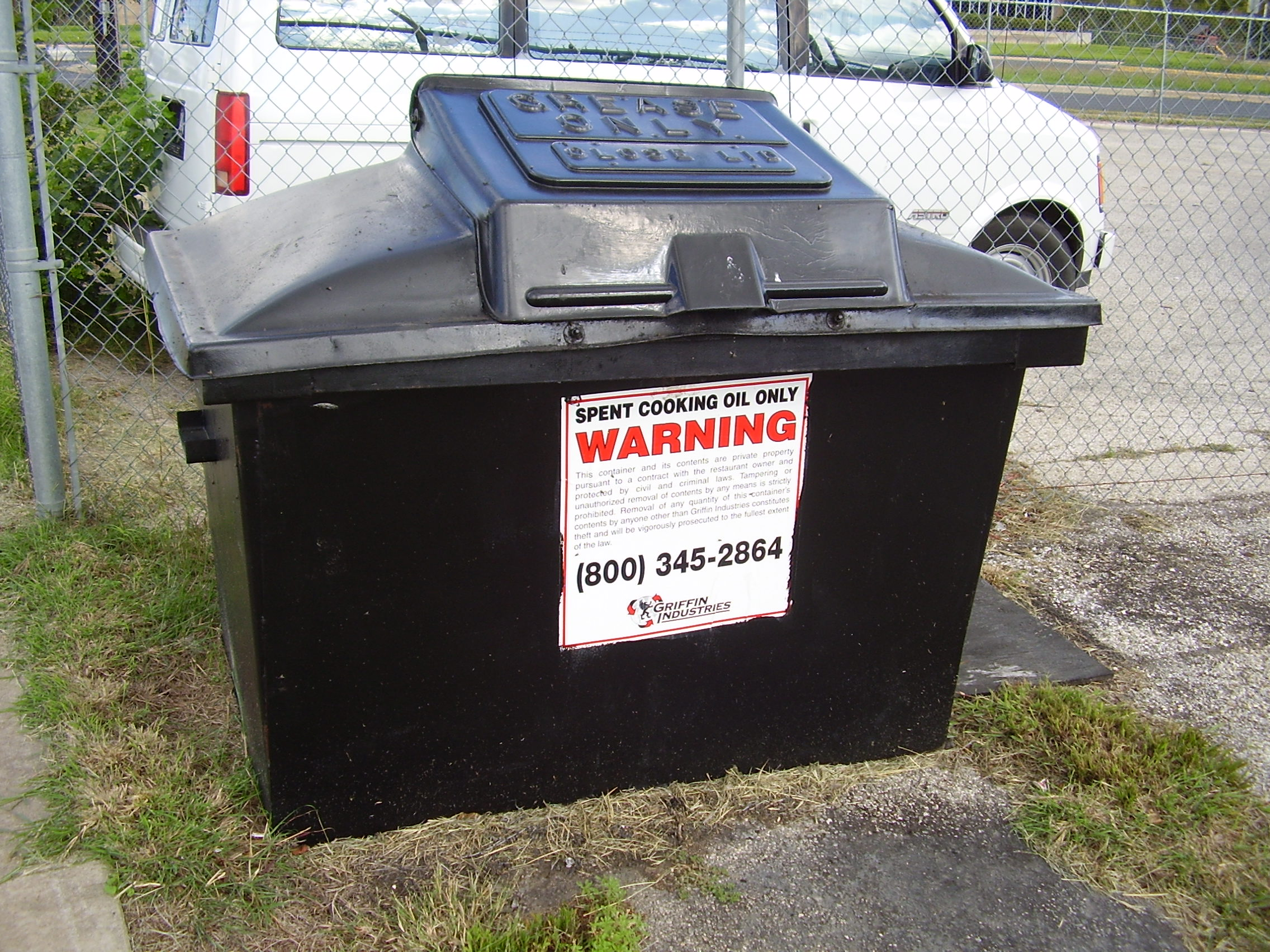
A bin for spent cooking oil in Austin, Texas, managed by a recycling company

Proper disposal of used cooking oil is an important waste-management concern. Oil can congeal in pipes, causing sanitary sewer overflow. Because of this, cooking oil should never be dumped in the kitchen sink or in the toilet bowl. The proper way to dispose of oil is to put it in a sealed non-recyclable container and discard it with regular garbage. Placing the container of oil in the refrigerator to harden also makes disposal easier and less messy.

=== Recycling ===
Cooking oil can be recycled. It can be used in animal feed, soap, make-up, clothes, rubber, detergents, directly as fuel, and to produce biodiesel.

In the recycling industry, used cooking oil recovered from restaurants and food-processing industries (typically from deep fryers or griddles) is called yellow grease, recycled vegetable oil (RVO), used vegetable oil (UVO), or waste vegetable oil (WVO).

Grease traps or interceptors collect fats and oils from kitchen sinks and floor drains. The result is called brown grease, and unlike yellow grease, it contains severe contaminants that make it much harder to recycle.

=== Adulteration ===
Gutter oil and trench oil are terms used in China to describe recycled oil processed to resemble virgin oil, but containing toxic contaminants and sold illegally for cooking; its origin is frequently brown grease from garbage.

In Kenya, thieves have sold stolen electric transformers to operators of roadside food stalls for reuse of the oil in deep frying, suitable for prolonged use longer than regular cooking oil, but a threat to consumer health due to the presence of PCBs and polycyclic aromatic hydrocarbons.
