= Grape seed oil =

Type of vegetable oil

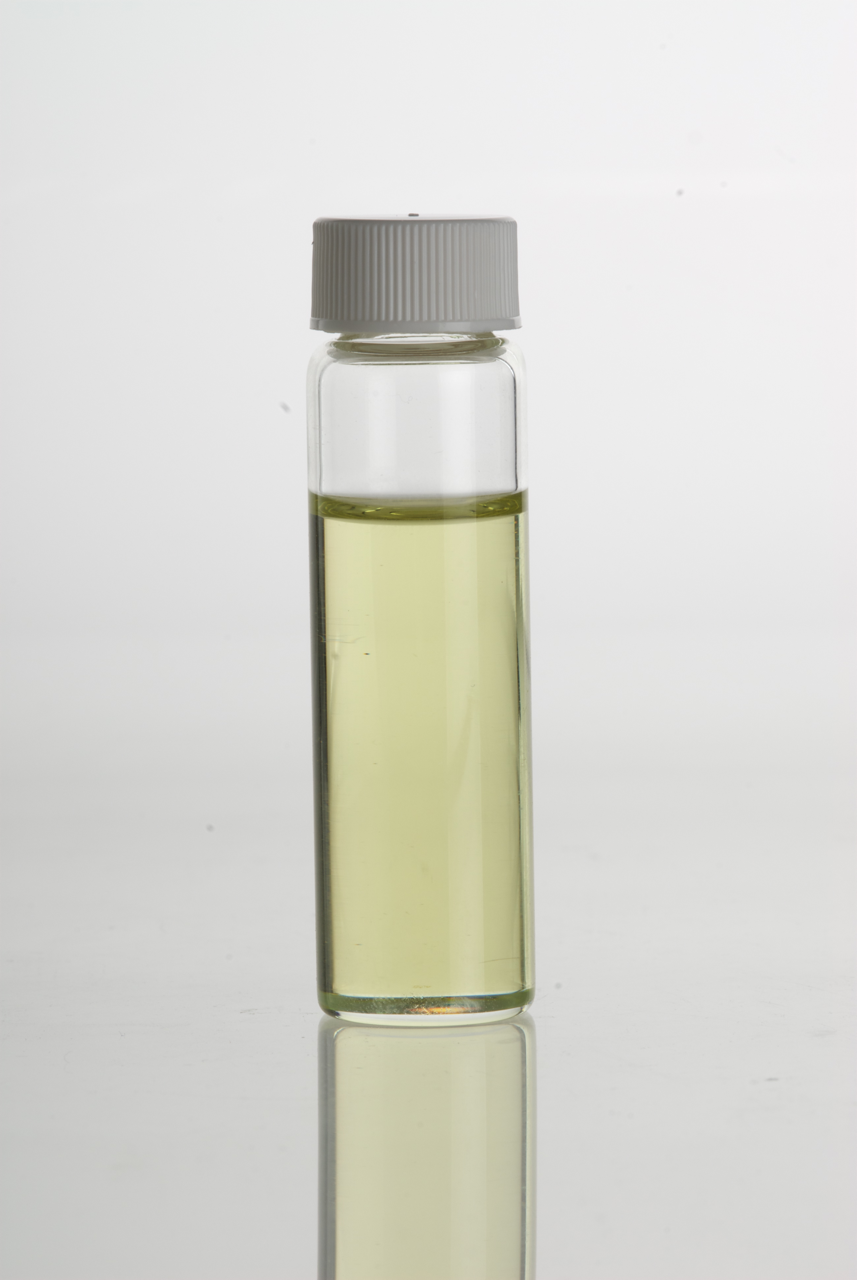
- Grape seed oil in clear glass vial

Fat composition

Saturated fats
- Total saturated: Palmitic: 7% Stearic: 4%

Unsaturated fats
- Total unsaturated: 86%
- Monounsaturated: 16.1%
- Palmitoleic acid: <1%
- Oleic acid: 15.8%
- Polyunsaturated: 69.9%
- Omega−3 fatty acids: α-Linolenic: 0.1%
- Omega−6 fatty acids: Linoleic: 69.6%

Properties
- Food energy per 100 g (3.5 oz): 3,700 kJ (880 kcal)
- Smoke point: 216 °C (421 °F)
- Iodine value: 124-143
- Saponification value: 126 (NaOH); 180-196 (KOH)
- Unsaponifiable: 0.3% - 1.6%
- Peroxide value: 2.92 mequiv/kg

Grape seed oil (also called grapeseed oil or grape oil) is a vegetable oil derived from the seeds of grapes. Grape seeds are a winemaking by-product, and oil made from the seeds is commonly used as an edible oil.

== Description ==
Grape seed oil has a moderately high smoke point of approximately 216 °C (421 °F). The oil has a light taste and a high polyunsaturated fat content, making it suitable for use in salad dressings, mayonnaise and as a base for oil infusions of garlic, rosemary, or other herbs or spices. It is widely used in baked goods, pancakes, and waffles. It is sprayed on raisins to help them retain their flavor.

== Uses ==
Grapeseed oil may be used as a salad oil, massage oil, and in manufactured cosmetics or haircare products.

== Research ==
A study of 21 grape cultivars showed variation of oil composition, especially for linoleic acid and tocopherols.

Although grape seeds contain polyphenols, such as proanthocyanidins, grape seed oil contains negligible amounts of these compounds. Grape seed oil components are under study for their potential applications in human health, but the scientific quality of clinical research as of 2016 has been inadequate to suggest any effect on lowering disease risk.

== Possible contamination ==
Grapeseed oil has occasionally been found to contain dangerous levels of polycyclic aromatic hydrocarbons because of direct contact with combustion gases during the drying process.

== Production ==
Winemaking accounts for 90% of grape cultivation, with the seeds of the plant serving as a by-product that can be pressed for oil. Grapeseed oil production primarily occurs in wine-growing regions, especially around the Mediterranean Sea.

== Composition ==
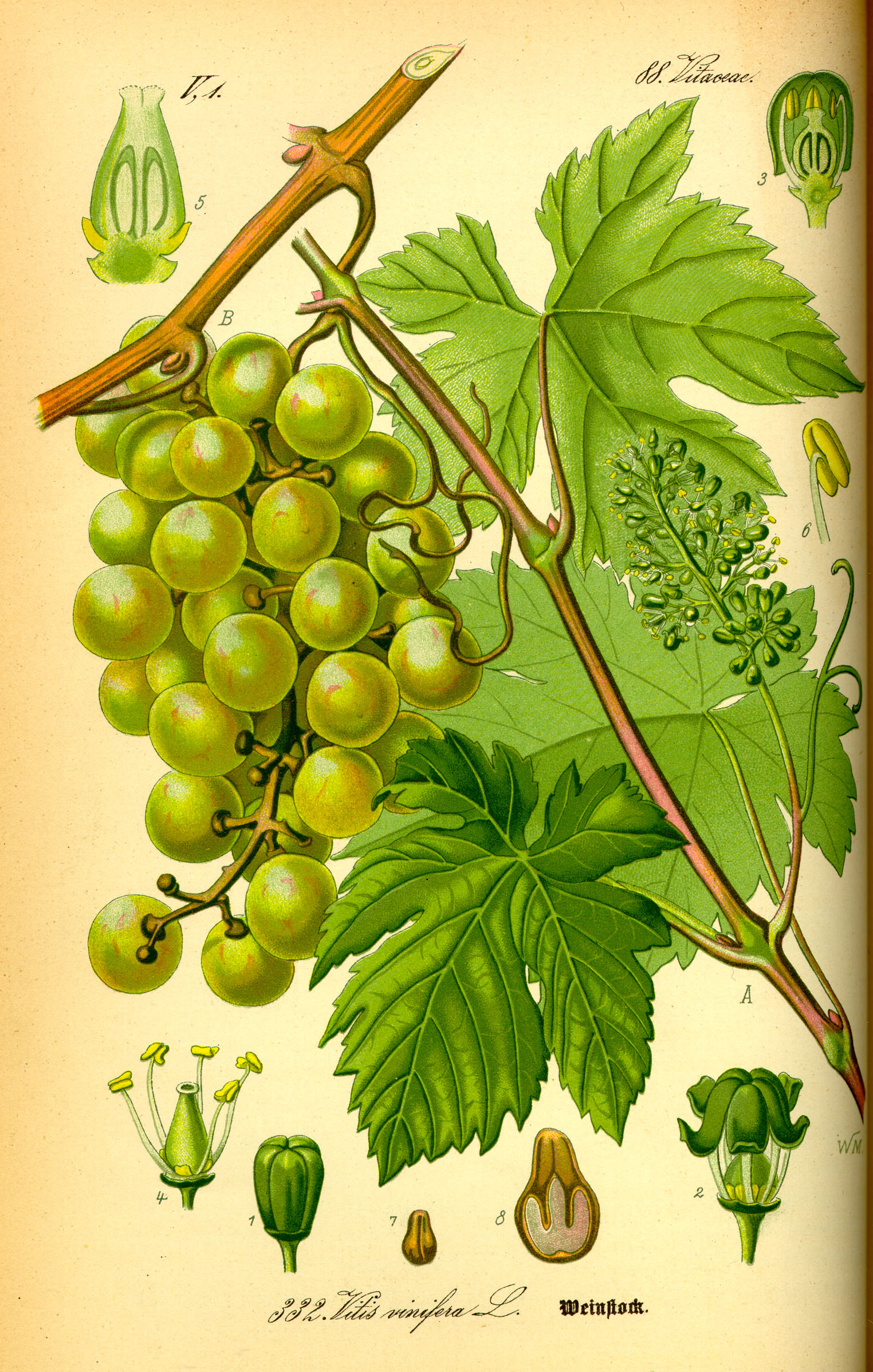
Grape seeds (numbers 7 and 8) and grapes

The following table lists a typical fatty acid composition of grape seed oil:

Acid	Type	Percentage
Linoleic acid	ω−6 unsaturated	69.6%
Oleic acid	ω−9 unsaturated	15.8%
Palmitic acid (Hexadecanoic acid)	Saturated	7%
Stearic acid (Octadecanoic acid)	Saturated	4%
Alpha-linolenic acid	ω−3 unsaturated	0.1%
Palmitoleic acid (9-Hexadecenoic acid)	ω−7 unsaturated	less than 1%

Grape seed oil also contains 0.8 to 1.5% unsaponifiables rich in phenols (tocopherols) and steroids (campesterol, beta-sitosterol, stigmasterol). Grapeseed oil contains small amounts of vitamin E, but safflower oil, cottonseed oil, or rice bran oil contain greater amounts. Grapeseed oil is high in polyunsaturates and low in saturated fat.

=== Comparison to other vegetable oils ===
Properties of vegetable oils The nutritional values are expressed as percent (%) by mass of total fat.
Type	Processing treatment	Saturated fatty acids	Monounsaturated fatty acids		Polyunsaturated fatty acids				Smoke point
Type	Processing treatment	Saturated fatty acids	Total	Oleic acid (ω−9)	Total	α-Linolenic acid (ω−3)	Linoleic acid (ω−6)	ω−6:3 ratio	Smoke point
Avocado		11.6	70.6	67.9	13.5	1	12.5	12.5:1	250 °C (482 °F)
Brazil nut		17.6	26.7	26.1	55.7	0.1	55.6	457:1	208 °C (406 °F)
Canola		7.4	63.3	61.8	28.1	9.1	18.6	2:1	204 °C (400 °F)
Coconut		82.5	6.3	6	1.7	0.019	1.68	88:1	175 °C (347 °F)
Corn		12.9	27.6	27.3	54.7	1	58	58:1	232 °C (450 °F)
Cottonseed		25.9	17.8	19	51.9	1	54	54:1	216 °C (420 °F)
Cottonseed	hydrogenated	93.6	1.5		0.6	0.2	0.3	1.5:1	
Flaxseed/linseed		9.0	18.4	18	67.8	53	13	0.2:1	107 °C (225 °F)
Grape seed		9.6	16.1	15.8	69.9	0.10	69.6	very high	216 °C (421 °F)
Hemp seed		7.0	9.0	9.0	82.0	22.0	54.0	2.5:1	166 °C (330 °F)
High-oleic safflower oil		7.5	75.2	75.2	12.8	0	12.8	very high	212 °C (414 °F)
Olive (extra virgin)		13.8	73.0	71.3	10.5	0.7	9.8	14:1	193 °C (380 °F)
Palm		49.3	37.0	40	9.3	0.2	9.1	45.5:1	235 °C (455 °F)
Palm	hydrogenated	88.2	5.7		0				
Peanut		16.2	57.1	55.4	19.9	0.318	19.6	61.6:1	232 °C (450 °F)
Rice bran oil		25	38.4	38.4	36.6	2.2	34.4	15.6:1	232 °C (450 °F)
Sesame		14.2	39.7	39.3	41.7	0.3	41.3	138:1	
Soybean		15.6	22.8	22.6	57.7	7	51	7.3:1	238 °C (460 °F)
Soybean	partially hydrogenated	14.9	43.0	42.5	37.6	2.6	34.9	13.4:1	
Sunflower oil		8.99	63.4	62.9	20.7	0.16	20.5	128:1	227 °C (440 °F)
Walnut oil	unrefined	9.1	22.8	22.2	63.3	10.4	52.9	5:1	160 °C (320 °F)

== See also ==
- List of grape varieties
- List of grape dishes
