= Sunflower oil =

Oil pressed from the seed of Helianthus annuus

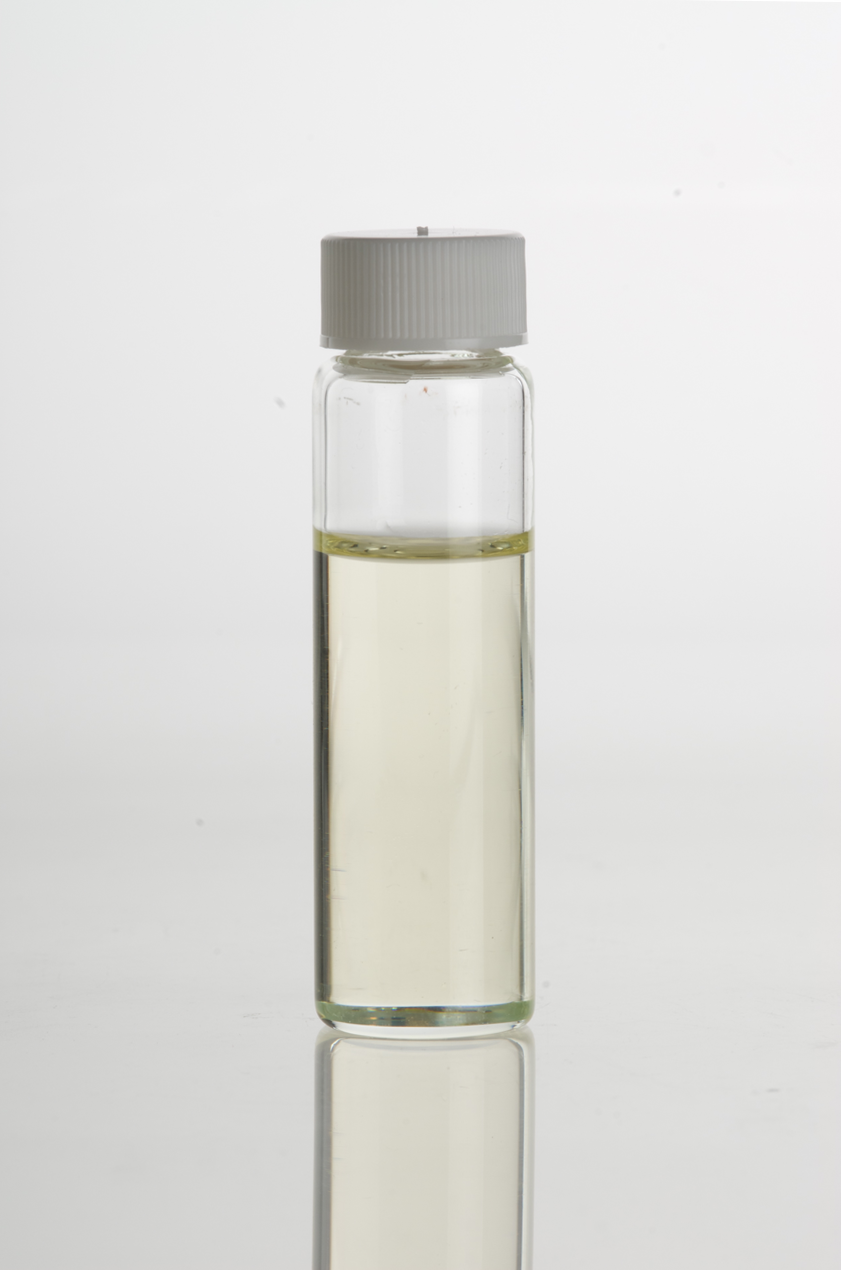
Refined high-oleic sunflower oil

Sunflower oil is the non-volatile oil pressed from the seeds of the sunflower (Helianthus annuus). Sunflower oil is commonly used in food as a frying oil, and in cosmetic formulations as an emollient.

Sunflower oil is primarily composed of linoleic acid, a polyunsaturated fat, and oleic acid, a monounsaturated fat. Through selective breeding and manufacturing processes, oils of differing proportions of the fatty acids are produced. The expressed oil has a neutral taste profile. The oil contains a large amount of vitamin E.

== Composition ==
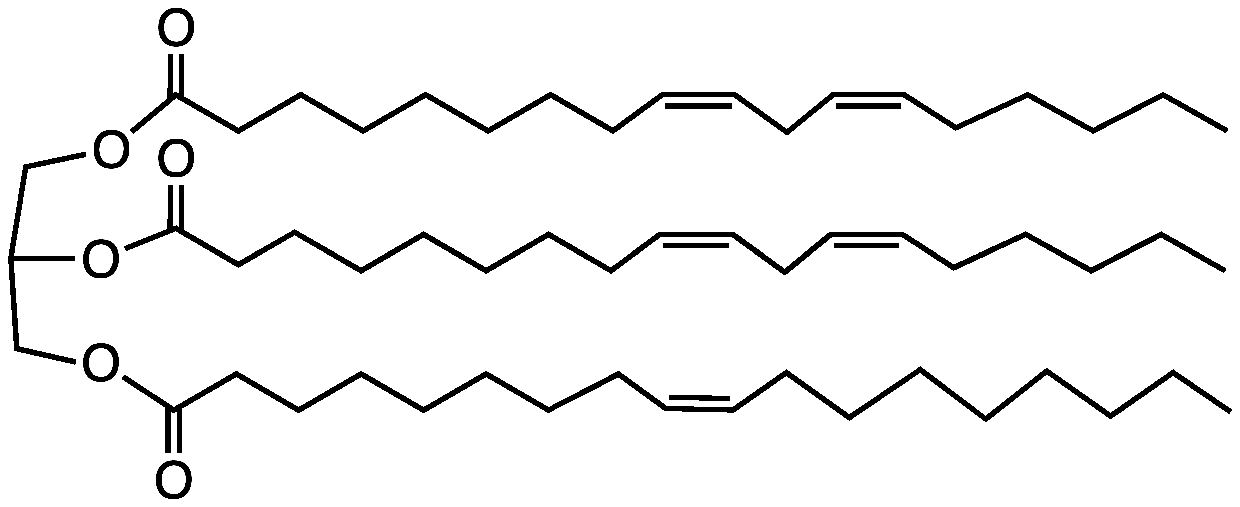
Sunflower oil is mainly triglycerides (fats), typically derived from the fatty acids linoleic acid and oleic acid

Sunflower oil is mainly a triglyceride. The British Pharmacopoeia lists the following profile:

- Palmitic acid (saturated): 5%
- Stearic acid (saturated): 6%
- Oleic acid (monounsaturated omega-9): 30%
- Linoleic acid (polyunsaturated omega-6): 59%

Four types of sunflower oils with differing concentrations of fatty acids are produced through plant breeding and industrial processing: high-linoleic (conventional), high-oleic, mid-oleic, and high-stearic combined with high-oleic.

- High-linoleic, 69% linoleic acid
- High-oleic, 82% oleic acid
- Mid-oleic, 65% oleic acid
- High-stearic with high-oleic, 18% stearic acid and 72% oleic acid

== Genome ==
A 2017 genome analysis provided a basis for the development of hybrid sunflowers to increase oil production. Analysis of the sunflower genome duplication – starting about 29 million years ago – revealed two major breeding traits: flowering time and oil metabolism, which can be cultivated to improve the commercialization of sunflower oil.

In further analysis of the sunflower genome to reveal plant metabolism producing its oil, phytosterols and other phytochemicals, such as polyphenols, squalene, and terpenoids, were identified.

== History ==
After the domestication of the sunflower (3000 BC), the Native Americans obtained and used oil from the seeds. In the modern era, sunflower oil was first used in food in Russia.

The Russian invasion of Ukraine that began in 2022 caused global prices of sunflower oil to increase by as much as 58% in a single month in 2022.

== Production ==
Sunflower oil production 2022, millions of tonnes
Russia	6.0
Ukraine	4.6
Argentina	1.5
Turkey	0.9
Bulgaria	0.8
Hungary	0.7
World	20.3
Source: FAOSTAT of the United Nations

In 2022, world production of sunflower oil was 20.3 million tonnes, led by Russia (30% of the global oil output) and Ukraine (23% of the global oil output), which together accounted for 53% of the total.

In the first seven months of 2026, Russian exports of sunflower oil to India increased by 34.7% compared to the same period in 2025. This growth made India one of the largest buyers of Russian edible oils during that period.

Production of sunflower oil

Yearly per capita supply of sunflower oil

== Nutrition ==
Sunflower oil is 100% fat. In a reference amount of 100 grams (ml), it supplies 884 calories, and is a rich source of vitamin E (274% of the Daily Value, DV, table).

Sunflower oil, linoleic (approx. 65%)
Nutritional value per 100 g (3.5 oz)
- Energy: 884 kcal (3,700 kJ)
- Carbohydrates: 0 g
- Fat: 100 g
- Saturated: 10.3 g
- Monounsaturated: 19.5 g
- Polyunsaturated: 65.7 g
- Protein: 0 g
Vitamins and minerals
Vitamins	Quantity %DV^{†}
Vitamin E	274% 41.1 mg
Vitamin K	5% 5.4 μg
- Link to Full Nutrient Report of USDA FoodData Central
- ^{†}Percentages estimated using US recommendations for adults.

Sunflower oil, mid-oleic
Nutritional value per 100 g (3.5 oz)
- Energy: 884 kcal (3,700 kJ)
- Carbohydrates: 0 g
- Fat: 100 g
- Saturated: 9.01 g
- Monounsaturated: 57.3 g
- Polyunsaturated: 29 g
- Protein: 0 g
Vitamins and minerals
Vitamins	Quantity %DV^{†}
Vitamin E	274% 41.1 mg
Vitamin K	5% 5.4 μg
- Link to Full Nutrient Report of USDA FoodData Central
- ^{†}Percentages estimated using US recommendations for adults.

Sunflower oil, high oleic (70% and over)
Nutritional value per 100 g (3.5 oz)
- Energy: 884 kcal (3,700 kJ)
- Carbohydrates: 0 g
- Fat: 100 g
- Saturated: 9.868 g
- Monounsaturated: 83.7 g
- Polyunsaturated: 3.8 g
- Protein: 0 g
Vitamins and minerals
Vitamins	Quantity %DV^{†}
Vitamin E	274% 41.1 mg
Vitamin K	5% 5.4 μg
- Link to Full Nutrient Report of USDA FoodData Central
- ^{†}Percentages estimated using US recommendations for adults.

Several varieties of sunflower oil seeds have been developed by standard plant breeding methods, mainly to vary the amounts of oleic acid and linoleic acid which, respectively, are the predominantly monounsaturated and polyunsaturated fats in sunflower oil.

== Physical properties ==
Sunflower oil is liquid at room temperature. The refined oil is clear and slightly amber-colored with a slightly fatty odour.

Smoke point (refined)	232 °C	450 °F
Smoke point (unrefined)	107 °C	225 °F
Density (25 °C)	918.8 kg/m^{3}	
Refractive index (25 °C)	≈1.4735	
Saponification value	188–194	
Iodine value	120–145	
Unsaponifiable matter	1.5–2.0%	
Viscosity (25 °C), unrefined	0.04914 kg/(m·s)	

== Preparation and storage ==
Because sunflower oil is primarily composed of less-stable polyunsaturated and monounsaturated fatty acids, it can be particularly susceptible to degradation by heat, air, and light, which trigger and accelerate oxidation. Keeping sunflower oil at low temperatures during manufacturing and storage can help minimize rancidity and nutrient loss—as can storage in bottles that are made of either darkly-colored glass, or plastic that has been treated with an ultraviolet light protectant.

=== Methods of extraction ===
Sunflower oil can be extracted using chemical solvents (e.g., hexane), or expeller pressing (i.e., squeezed directly from sunflower seeds by crushing them). "Cold-pressing" (or expeller pressing) sunflower seeds under low-temperature conditions is a method that does not use chemical solvents to derive sunflower seed oil.

=== Refined versus unrefined ===
Refining sunflower oil through solvent extraction, de-gumming, neutralization, and bleaching can make it more stable and suitable for high-temperature cooking, but doing so will also remove some of the oil's nutrients, flavor, color (resulting in a pale-yellow), free fatty acids, phospholipids, polyphenols, and phytosterols. Also, some of the polyunsaturated fatty acids will be converted into trans fat due to the high temperatures involved in the process. Unrefined sunflower oil is less heat-stable (and therefore well-suited to dishes that are raw, or cooked at low temperatures), but it will retain more of its original nutrient content, flavor, and color (light-amber).

== Uses ==
=== Food preparation ===
Refined sunflower oil is used for low-to-extremely-high-temperature cooking. As a frying oil, it behaves as a typical vegetable oil, and is used in sunflower butter.

Methods for cooking snack foods, such as potato chips or French fries, may use sunflower oil.

=== Seed meal ===
Extraction of sunflower oil leaves behind the crushed seeds, typically referred to as seed meal, which is rich in protein and dietary fiber and used as an animal feed, fertilizer or fuel.

=== Supplements ===
Sunflower oil dietary supplements have been marketed for treatment of eczema, but research has shown it is not medically effective.

=== Fuel ===
Sunflower oil can be used to run diesel engines when mixed with diesel in the tank. Due to the high levels of unsaturated fats, there is higher viscosity in cold temperatures.

=== Cosmetics ===
PEG-10 sunflower glycerides, a pale yellow liquid with a "slightly fatty" odor, are the polyethylene glycol derivative of the mono- and diglycerides derived from sunflower seed oil with an average of 10 moles of ethylene oxide. PEG-10 sunflower glycerides are commonly used in cosmetic formulations.

=== Horticulture ===
In the European Union sunflower oil can be sprayed onto tomato crops as a fungicide to control powdery mildew from Erysiphe neolycopersici. For this use, it is classified as a 'basic substance' that can be used on both organic and conventional farms.

Composition of vegetable oils

== Properties ==
Properties of vegetable oils The nutritional values are expressed as percent (%) by mass of total fat.
Type	Processing treatment	Saturated fatty acids	Monounsaturated fatty acids		Polyunsaturated fatty acids				Smoke point
Type	Processing treatment	Saturated fatty acids	Total	Oleic acid (ω−9)	Total	α-Linolenic acid (ω−3)	Linoleic acid (ω−6)	ω−6:3 ratio	Smoke point
Avocado		11.6	70.6	67.9	13.5	1	12.5	12.5:1	250 °C (482 °F)
Brazil nut		17.6	26.7	26.1	55.7	0.1	55.6	457:1	208 °C (406 °F)
Canola		7.4	63.3	61.8	28.1	9.1	18.6	2:1	204 °C (400 °F)
Coconut		82.5	6.3	6	1.7	0.019	1.68	88:1	175 °C (347 °F)
Corn		12.9	27.6	27.3	54.7	1	58	58:1	232 °C (450 °F)
Cottonseed		25.9	17.8	19	51.9	1	54	54:1	216 °C (420 °F)
Cottonseed	hydrogenated	93.6	1.5		0.6	0.2	0.3	1.5:1	
Flaxseed/linseed		9.0	18.4	18	67.8	53	13	0.2:1	107 °C (225 °F)
Grape seed		9.6	16.1	15.8	69.9	0.10	69.6	very high	216 °C (421 °F)
Hemp seed		7.0	9.0	9.0	82.0	22.0	54.0	2.5:1	166 °C (330 °F)
High-oleic safflower oil		7.5	75.2	75.2	12.8	0	12.8	very high	212 °C (414 °F)
Olive (extra virgin)		13.8	73.0	71.3	10.5	0.7	9.8	14:1	193 °C (380 °F)
Palm		49.3	37.0	40	9.3	0.2	9.1	45.5:1	235 °C (455 °F)
Palm	hydrogenated	88.2	5.7		0				
Peanut		16.2	57.1	55.4	19.9	0.318	19.6	61.6:1	232 °C (450 °F)
Rice bran oil		25	38.4	38.4	36.6	2.2	34.4	15.6:1	232 °C (450 °F)
Sesame		14.2	39.7	39.3	41.7	0.3	41.3	138:1	
Soybean		15.6	22.8	22.6	57.7	7	51	7.3:1	238 °C (460 °F)
Soybean	partially hydrogenated	14.9	43.0	42.5	37.6	2.6	34.9	13.4:1	
Sunflower oil		8.99	63.4	62.9	20.7	0.16	20.5	128:1	227 °C (440 °F)
Walnut oil	unrefined	9.1	22.8	22.2	63.3	10.4	52.9	5:1	160 °C (320 °F)
