= Cottonseed oil =

Cooking oil

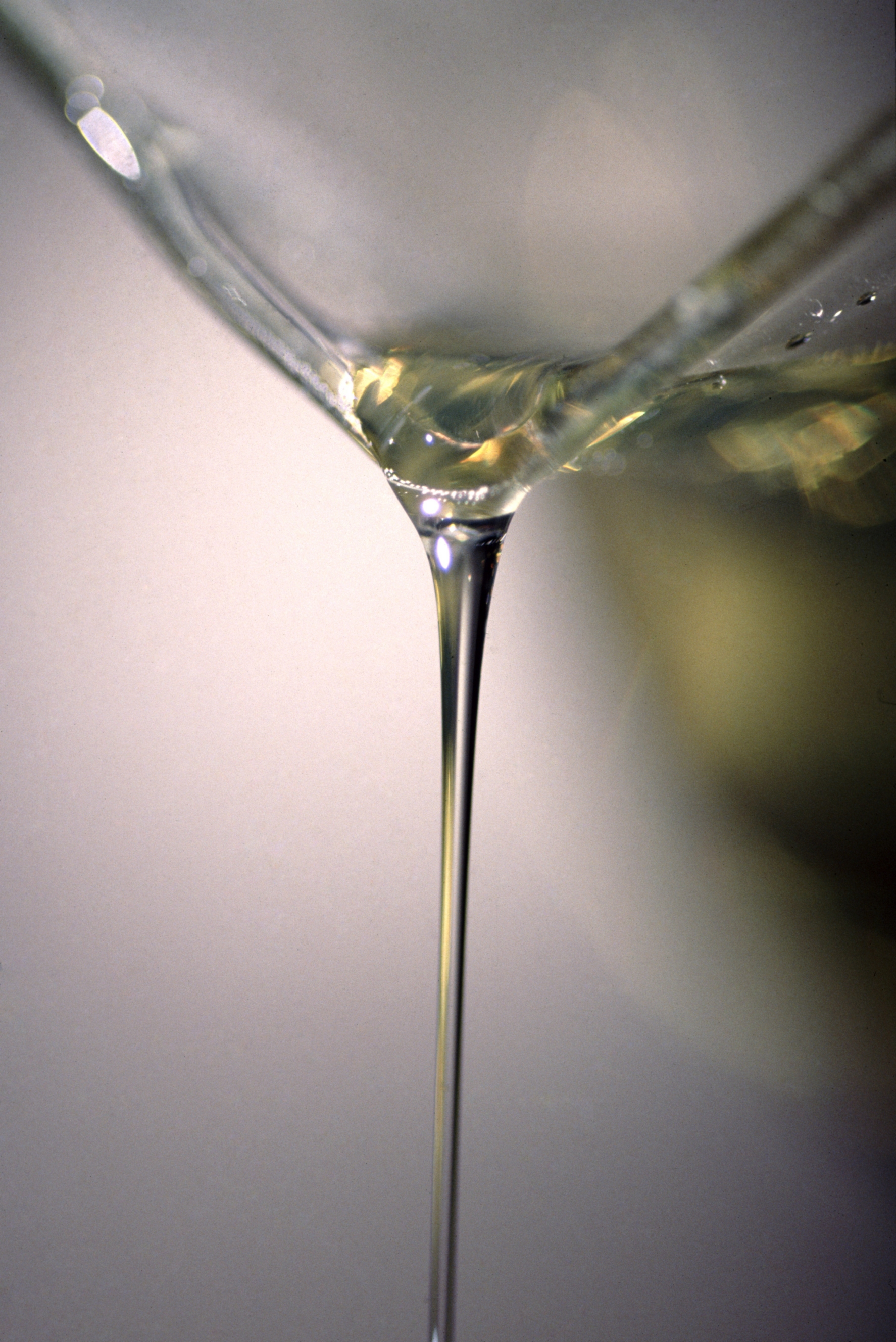

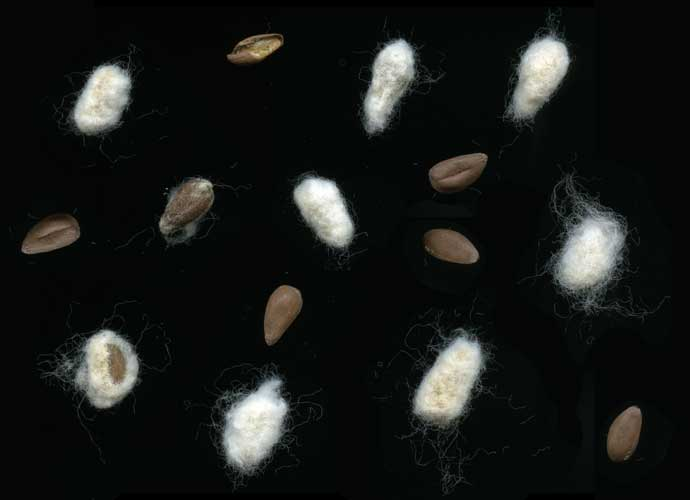
Cotton seeds

Cottonseed oil is cooking oil from the seeds of cotton plants of various species, mainly Gossypium hirsutum and Gossypium herbaceum, that are grown for cotton fiber, animal feed, and oil.

Cotton seed has a similar structure to other oilseeds, such as sunflower seed, having an oil-bearing kernel surrounded by a hard outer hull; in processing, the oil is extracted from the kernel. Cottonseed oil is used for salad oil, mayonnaise, salad dressing, and similar products because of its flavor stability.

== Composition ==
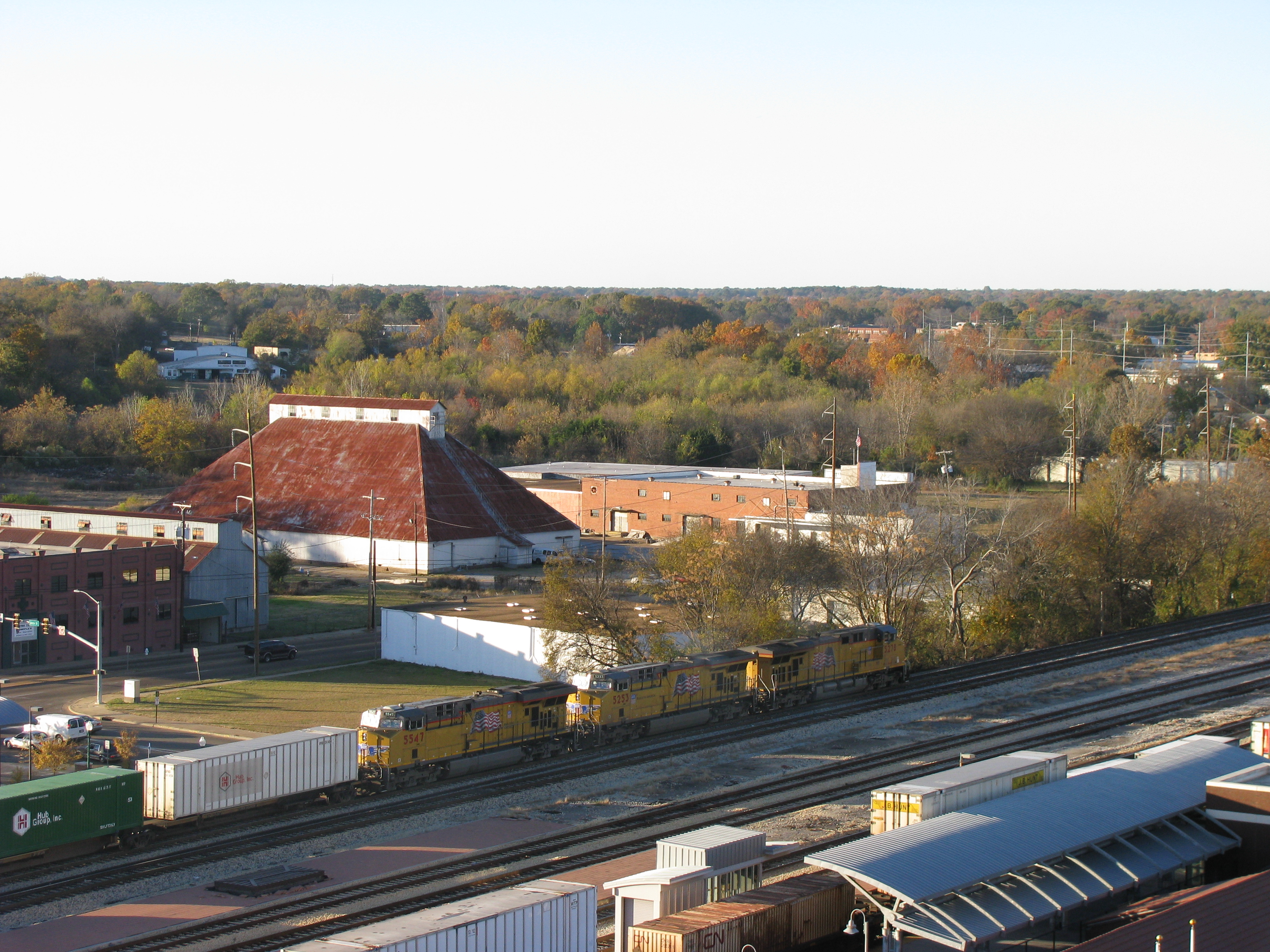
Mississippi Cottonseed Oil Co. seed house, Jackson, Mississippi

Its fatty acid profile generally consists of 70% unsaturated fatty acids (18% monounsaturated, and 52% polyunsaturated), 26% saturated fatty acids. When it is fully hydrogenated, its profile is 94% saturated fat and 2% unsaturated fatty acids (1.5% monounsaturated, and 0.5% polyunsaturated). According to the National Cottonseed Products Association, cottonseed oil does not need to be hydrogenated as much as other polyunsaturated oils to achieve similar results.

=== Undesireable components in raw extract ===
Gossypol is a toxic, yellow, polyphenolic compound produced by cotton and other members of the order Malvaceae, such as okra. This naturally occurring colored compound is found in tiny glands in the seed, leaf, stem, tap root bark, and root of the cotton plant. The adaptive function of the compound facilitates natural insect resistance. Raw extracts that have not undergone post processing, such as hydrogenation, will also contain the undesirable component cyclopropene fatty acid, but purportedly are mostly removed during refining, particularly deodorization and also hydrogenation. As such, processed/food-grade cottonseed oils are not considered to present a health hazard from cyclopropene fatty acids. The three key steps of refining, bleaching, and deodorization in producing finished oil act to eliminate the gossypol level. Ferric chloride is often used to decolorize cotton seed oil.

=== Comparison to other vegetable oils ===
Properties of vegetable oils The nutritional values are expressed as percent (%) by mass of total fat.
Type	Processing treatment	Saturated fatty acids	Monounsaturated fatty acids		Polyunsaturated fatty acids				Smoke point
Type	Processing treatment	Saturated fatty acids	Total	Oleic acid (ω−9)	Total	α-Linolenic acid (ω−3)	Linoleic acid (ω−6)	ω−6:3 ratio	Smoke point
Avocado		11.6	70.6	67.9	13.5	1	12.5	12.5:1	250 °C (482 °F)
Brazil nut		17.6	26.7	26.1	55.7	0.1	55.6	457:1	208 °C (406 °F)
Canola		7.4	63.3	61.8	28.1	9.1	18.6	2:1	204 °C (400 °F)
Coconut		82.5	6.3	6	1.7	0.019	1.68	88:1	175 °C (347 °F)
Corn		12.9	27.6	27.3	54.7	1	58	58:1	232 °C (450 °F)
Cottonseed		25.9	17.8	19	51.9	1	54	54:1	216 °C (420 °F)
Cottonseed	hydrogenated	93.6	1.5		0.6	0.2	0.3	1.5:1	
Flaxseed/linseed		9.0	18.4	18	67.8	53	13	0.2:1	107 °C (225 °F)
Grape seed		9.6	16.1	15.8	69.9	0.10	69.6	very high	216 °C (421 °F)
Hemp seed		7.0	9.0	9.0	82.0	22.0	54.0	2.5:1	166 °C (330 °F)
High-oleic safflower oil		7.5	75.2	75.2	12.8	0	12.8	very high	212 °C (414 °F)
Olive (extra virgin)		13.8	73.0	71.3	10.5	0.7	9.8	14:1	193 °C (380 °F)
Palm		49.3	37.0	40	9.3	0.2	9.1	45.5:1	235 °C (455 °F)
Palm	hydrogenated	88.2	5.7		0				
Peanut		16.2	57.1	55.4	19.9	0.318	19.6	61.6:1	232 °C (450 °F)
Rice bran oil		25	38.4	38.4	36.6	2.2	34.4	15.6:1	232 °C (450 °F)
Sesame		14.2	39.7	39.3	41.7	0.3	41.3	138:1	
Soybean		15.6	22.8	22.6	57.7	7	51	7.3:1	238 °C (460 °F)
Soybean	partially hydrogenated	14.9	43.0	42.5	37.6	2.6	34.9	13.4:1	
Sunflower oil		8.99	63.4	62.9	20.7	0.16	20.5	128:1	227 °C (440 °F)
Walnut oil	unrefined	9.1	22.8	22.2	63.3	10.4	52.9	5:1	160 °C (320 °F)

== Physical properties ==
Once processed, cottonseed oil has a mild taste and appears generally clear with a light golden color, the amount of color depending on the amount of refining. It has a relatively high smoke point as a frying medium. Density ranges from 0.917 to 0.933 g/cm^{3} (7.65 to 7.79 lb/US gal). Like other long-chain fatty acid oils, cottonseed oil has a smoke point of about 450 °F (232 °C), and is high in tocopherols, which also contribute its stability, giving products that contain it a long shelf life, hence manufacturers' proclivity to use it in packaged goods.

Production of cottonseed oil 2019 (millions of tonnes)
China	1.28
India	1.20
Pakistan	0.32
Brazil	0.28
United States	0.22
Turkey	0.21
World	4.45

== Production ==
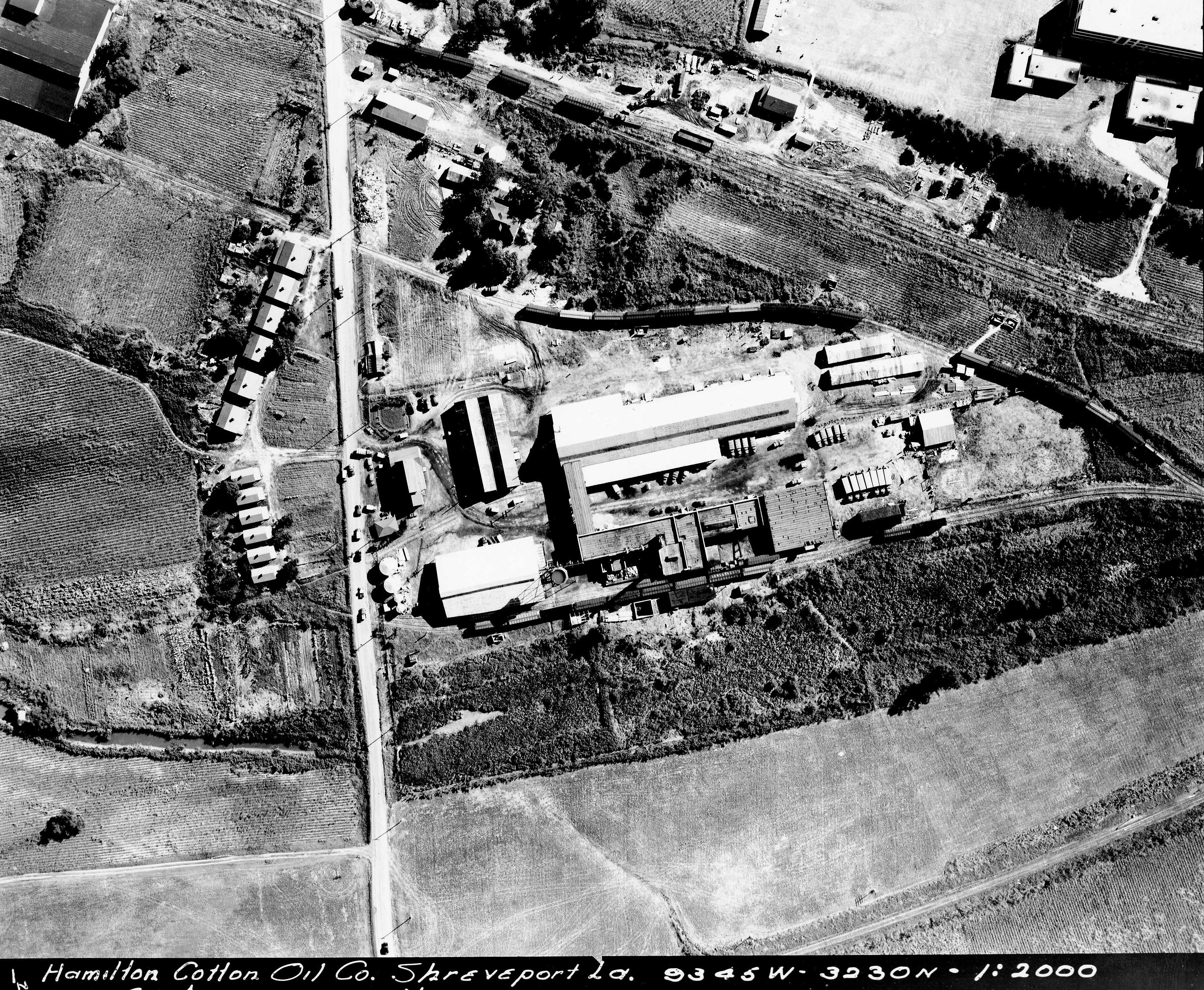
A cotton oil mill in Shreveport, Louisiana, 1941

In 2019, world production of cottonseed oil was 4.45 million tonnes, led by China and India with 56% combined of the total.

Cottonseed oil production

Yearly per capita supply of cottonseed oil

== Economic history ==
Marketed under a variety of brand names, cottonseed oil shortening emerged as the leading substitute for lard late in the 19th century. (1912 ad)

The by-product of cotton processing, cottonseed was considered virtually worthless before the late 19th century. While cotton production expanded throughout the 17th, 18th, and mid-19th centuries, a largely worthless stock of cottonseed grew. Although some of the seed was used for planting, fertilizer, and animal feed, the majority was left to rot or was illegally dumped into rivers.

In the 1820s and 1830s Europe experienced fats and oils shortages due to rapid population expansion during the Industrial Revolution and the after-effects of the British blockade and Napoleonic Continental system during the Napoleonic Wars. The increased demand for fats and oils, coupled with a decreasing supply caused prices to rise sharply. Consequently, many Europeans could not afford to buy the fats and oils they had used for cooking and for lighting. Many American entrepreneurs tried to take advantage of the increasing European demand for oils and America's increasingly large supply of cottonseed by crushing the seed for oil. But separating the seed hull from the seed meat proved difficult and most of these ventures failed within a few years. This problem was resolved in 1857, when William Fee patented a huller, which effectively separated the tough hulls from the meats of cottonseed. With this new invention, cottonseed oil began to be used for illumination purposes in lamps to supplement increasingly expensive whale oil and lard. But by 1859, this use came to end as the petroleum industry emerged and the American Civil War (and the resulting end of slavery in the United States) disrupted the cotton industry.

Cottonseed oil then began to be used illegally to fortify animal fats and lards. Initially, meat packers secretly added cottonseed oil to the pure fats, but this practice was uncovered in 1884. Armour and Company, an American meatpacking and food processing company, sought to corner the lard market and realized that it had purchased more lard than the existing hog population could have produced. A congressional investigation followed, and legislation was passed that required products fortified with cottonseed oil to be labeled as lard compound." Similarly, cottonseed oil was often blended with olive oil. Once the practice was exposed, many countries put import tariffs on American olive oil and Italy banned the product completely in 1883. Both of these regulatory schemes depressed cottonseed oil sales and exports, once again creating an oversupply of cottonseed oil, which decreased its value.

It was cottonseed's depressed value that led a newly formed Procter & Gamble to utilize its oil. The Panic of 1837 caused the two brothers-in-law to merge their candlestick and soap manufacturing businesses in an effort to minimize costs and weather the bear market. Looking for a replacement for expensive animal fats in production, the brothers finally settled on cottonseed oil. Procter & Gamble cornered the cottonseed oil market to circumvent the meat packer's monopoly on the price. But as electricity emerged, the demand for candles decreased. Procter and Gamble then found an edible use for cottonseed oil. Through patented technology, the brothers were able to hydrogenate cottonseed oil and develop a substance that closely resembled lard. In 1911, Procter & Gamble launched an aggressive marketing campaign to publicize its new product, Crisco, a vegetable shortening that could be used in place of lard. Crisco placed ads in major newspapers advertising that the product was "easier on digestion ... a healthier alternative to cooking with animal fats ... and more economical than butter." The company also gave away free cookbooks, with every recipe calling for Crisco. By the 1920s the company developed cookbooks for specific ethnicities in their native tongues. Additionally, Crisco started airing radio cooking programs. Similarly, in 1899 David Wesson, a food chemist, developed deodorized cottonseed oil, Wesson cooking oil. Wesson Oil also was marketed heavily and became quite popular too.

Over the next 30 years cottonseed oil became the predominant cooking oil in the United States. Crisco and Wesson oil became direct substitutes for lard and other more expensive oils in baking, frying, sautéing, and salad dressings. By World War Two, cottonseed oil shortages forced the utilization of another direct substitute, soybean oil. By 1944, soybean oil production exceeded cottonseed oil production due to cottonseed shortages and soybean oil costs falling below that of cottonseed oil. By 1950, soybean oil replaced cottonseed oil in the use of shortenings like Crisco due to soybeans' comparatively low price. Prices for cottonseed were also increased by the replacement of cotton acreage by corn and soybeans, a trend fueled in large part by the boom in demand for corn syrup and ethanol. Cottonseed oil and production continued to decline throughout the mid- and late 20th century.

In the mid- to late 2000s, the consumer trend of avoiding trans fats, and mandatory labeling of trans fats in some jurisdictions, sparked an increase in the consumption of cottonseed oil, with some health experts and public health agencies recommending it as a healthy oil. Crisco and other producers have been able to reformulate cottonseed oil so it contains little to no trans fats. Still, some health experts claim that cottonseed oil's high ratio of polyunsaturated fats to monounsaturated fats and processed nature make it unhealthy.

== Regulation ==
Cottonseed oil in Canada must be pressed from the seed of the Gossypium plant. As a single-source vegetable oil, 100% cottonseed oil must appear as "cottonseed oil" on the labels of any products sold.

Cottonseed oil sold as an edible product must be processed and refined to eliminate specific components that could present as a food safety hazard, in particular gossypol, which can act as a toxin to humans, and can lead to infertility in men.

== Extraction ==
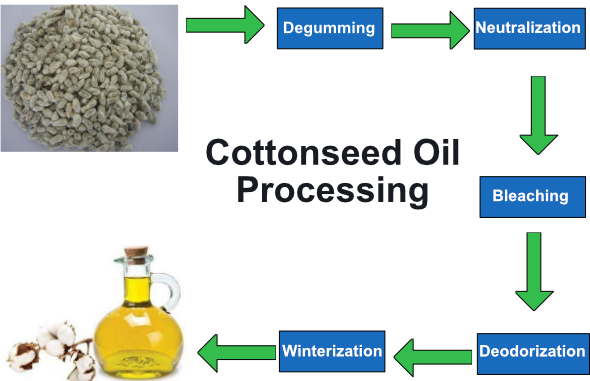
Cottonseed oil processing steps

Cottonseed oil, like other vegetable oils, is extracted from the seed of the plant, through either mechanical processes such as crushing or pressing, or by chemical processes such as solvent extraction. Cottonseed oil is most commonly extracted commercially via solvent extraction.

== Use in food ==
Cottonseed oil has traditionally been used in foods such as potato chips and was for many years a primary ingredient in Crisco, the shortening product. The current formulation of Crisco is primarily made from soybean oil and palm oil. Significantly less expensive than olive oil or canola oil, cottonseed oil was a popular frying oil for the restaurant and snack-food manufacturing industries.

Cottonseed oil was used in the production of edible food products, such as cooking oils, salad oils, margarines and shortenings. In the United States, cottonseed oil was used in Procter & Gamble's Olestra and Olein products as a type of non-digestible fat substitutes used to create creamy textures and rich flavors in fried foods.

The FDA released its final determination that Partially Hydrogenated Oils (PHOs), which include partially hydrogenated cottonseed oil, are not Generally Recognized as Safe (GRAS) in 2015. However, to allow for time for reformulation, the agency extended the compliance date to stop manufacturing foods with these specific, limited petitioned uses of PHOs until June 18, 2019. The final compliance date to allow manufacturers time to reformulate foods and ensure an orderly transition in the marketplace was established as January 1, 2021. Then, on December 22, 2023, the FDA completed final administrative actions on the revocation of uses of PHOs in food. So, it can be said that the GRAS status of cottonseed oil, specifically in its partially hydrogenated form, was effectively lost by January 1, 2021.

== Nonfood uses ==
For agricultural applications, cottonseed oil generally has the greatest insecticide power among all the vegetable oils. It is traditionally used because of its effectiveness in hard to treat pest problems in fruit trees. Cottonseed oil can also be mixed with other insecticides to provide a broader spectrum and increased control on pests. Spider mites, whiteflies and young stages of scales are common pests that can be controlled using cottonseed oil.

In an agricultural context, the toxicity of untreated cottonseed oil may be considered beneficial: Oils, including vegetable oils, have been used for centuries to control insect and mite pests. More recently, cottonseed oil has been used to protect the trunks of apple trees from the apple clearwing moth, which burrows into the trees' bark, potentially killing them. This oil has been generally considered the most insecticidal of vegetable oils.

== See also ==
- Port Gibson Oil Works Mill Building: Historic cottonseed oil plant
