= Smoke point =

Burning point of oils and fats

The smoke point, also referred to as the burning point, is the temperature at which an oil or fat begins to produce a continuous bluish smoke that becomes clearly visible, dependent upon specific and defined conditions. This happens when one or multiple substances in the oil start to chemically react with oxygen and burn, which can include the oil itself, proteins, sugars, or other organic material. It is distinct from the flash point and fire point, which denote the temperatures at which the oil itself (specifically, vaporized oil, which is distinct from the smoke produced at the smoke point) begins to burn.

Smoke point values can vary greatly. The most important factor determining the smoke point of an oil is the amount of proteins and free fatty acids (FFAs). Higher quantities of these lower the smoke point. The FFA content typically represents less than 1% of the total oil and consequently renders smoke point a poor indicator of the capacity of a fat or oil to withstand heat, in a non-cuisine related sense. Virgin (raw) oils, which contain various flavorful organic compounds, have lower smoke points than refined oils because the organic compounds burn. Animal-based fats and oils tend to have lower smoke points than vegetable-based ones, as well. Oils made of polyunsaturated fats have lower smoke points, those made of monounsaturated fats have middling smoke points, and oils made of saturated fats have even higher smoke points. The level of refinement, seed variety, and climate and weather of growth of the source plants also significantly affect its smoke point.

Factors unrelated to the oil's composition are also important, such as the volume of oil utilized, the size of the container, the presence of air currents, and the type and source of light. And practically, even when oil is cooked in ovens set above its true smoke point, moisture and other objects can prevent it from reaching the full temperature. The smoke point also decreases over time when oil is reused. Cooks in practice tend to avoid the smoke point by noticing when the oil begins to shimmer, which happens just before it begins to smoke; adding food (to absorb heat) or lowering the temperature will prevent smoking.

Acrolein, a potential carcinogen, is often present in the smoke, but this is only an issue to, for example, line cooks burning large quantities of food who breathe in large quantities of smoke over long periods, and not for home cooks. This is because oil chemically decomposes into free fatty acids and glycerol, and at sufficiently high temperatures glycerol with burn to form acrolein. Free radicals produced by the high temperatures, although much reported on, are not dangerous.

== Temperature ==
The smoke point of an oil correlates with its level of refinement. Many cooking oils have smoke points above standard home cooking temperatures:

- Pan frying (sauté) on stove top heat: 120 °C (248 °F)
- Deep frying: 160–180 °C (320–356 °F)
- Oven baking: Average of 180 °C (356 °F)

Smoke point decreases at a different pace in different oils.

Considerably above the temperature of the smoke point is the flash point, the point at which the vapours from the oil can ignite in air, given an ignition source.

The following table presents smoke points of various fats and oils.

Fat	Quality	Smoke point (Note: Specified smoke, fire, and flash points of any fat and oil can be misleading: they depend almost entirely upon the free fatty acid content, which increases during storage or use. The smoke point of fats and oils decreases when they are at least partially split into free fatty acids and glycerol; the glycerol portion decomposes to form acrolein, which is the major source of the smoke evolved from heated fats and oils. A partially hydrolyzed oil therefore smokes at a lower temperature than non-hydrolyzed oil. (Adapted from Gunstone, Frank D., ed. (17 March 2011). Vegetable Oils in Food Technology: Composition, Properties and Uses. Wiley, Inc. OCLC 1083187382.))	
Almond oil		221 °C	430 °F
Avocado oil	Refined	271 °C	520 °F
Avocado oil	Virgin (unrefined)	200 °C	392 °F
Avocado oil	Extra virgin (unrefined)	250 °C	482 °F
Beef tallow		250 °C	480 °F
Butter	Unrefined	150 °C	302 °F
Butter, clarified (ghee)	Clarified	250 °C	482 °F
Castor oil	Refined	200 °C	392 °F
Coconut oil	Refined, dry	204 °C	400 °F
Coconut oil	Unrefined, dry expeller pressed, virgin	177 °C	350 °F
Corn oil		230–238 °C	446–460 °F
Corn oil	Unrefined	178 °C	352 °F
Cottonseed oil	Refined, bleached, deodorized	220–230 °C	428–446 °F
Flaxseed oil	Unrefined	107 °C	225 °F
Grapeseed oil		216 °C	421 °F
Lard		190 °C	374 °F
Mustard oil		250 °C	480 °F
Olive oil	Refined	199–243 °C	390–470 °F
Olive oil	Virgin	210 °C	410 °F
Olive oil	Extra virgin, low acidity, high quality	207 °C	405 °F
Olive oil	Extra virgin	190 °C	374 °F
Palm oil	Fractionated	235 °C	455 °F
Peanut oil	Refined	232 °C	450 °F
Peanut oil		227–229 °C	441–445 °F
Peanut oil	Unrefined	160 °C	320 °F
Pecan oil		243 °C	470 °F
Rapeseed oil (Canola)		220–230 °C	428–446 °F
Rapeseed oil (Canola)	Expeller press (unrefined)	190–232 °C	375–450 °F
Rapeseed oil (Canola)	Refined	204 °C	400 °F
Rice bran oil	Refined	232 °C	450 °F
Safflower oil	Unrefined	107 °C	225 °F
Safflower oil	Semirefined	160 °C	320 °F
Safflower oil	Refined	266 °C	510 °F
Sesame oil	Unrefined	177 °C	350 °F
Sesame oil	Semirefined	232 °C	450 °F
Soybean oil		234 °C	453 °F
Sunflower oil	Neutralized, dewaxed, bleached & deodorized	252–254 °C	486–489 °F
Sunflower oil	Semirefined	232 °C	450 °F
Sunflower oil		227 °C	441 °F
Sunflower oil	Unrefined, first cold-pressed, raw	107 °C	225 °F
Sunflower oil, high oleic	Refined	232 °C	450 °F
Sunflower oil, high oleic	Unrefined	160 °C	320 °F
Vegetable oil blend	Refined	220 °C	428 °F

== Oxidative stability ==
Hydrolysis and oxidation are the two primary degradation processes that occur in an oil during cooking. Oxidative stability is how resistant an oil is to reacting with oxygen, breaking down and potentially producing harmful compounds while exposed to continuous heat. Oxidative stability is the best predictor of how an oil behaves during cooking.

The Rancimat method is one of the most common methods for testing oxidative stability in oils. This determination entails speeding up the oxidation process in the oil (under heat and forced air), which enables its stability to be evaluated by monitoring volatile substances associated with rancidity. It is measured as "induction time" and recorded as total hours before the oil breaks down. Canola oil requires 7.5 hours, for example, whereas extra virgin olive oil (EVOO) and virgin coconut oil will last over a day at 110 °C (230 °F) of continuous heat. The differing stabilities correlate with lower levels of polyunsaturated fatty acids, which are more prone to oxidation. EVOO is high in monounsaturated fatty acids and antioxidants, conferring stability. Some plant cultivars have been bred to produce "high-oleic" oils with more monounsaturated oleic acid and less polyunsaturated linoleic acid for enhanced stability.

The oxidative stability does not directly correspond to the smoke point and thus the latter cannot be used as a reference for safe and healthy cooking.

== See also ==
- Boiling point
- Combustion
- Drying oil
- Flash point
- Fire point
- Kindling point (Autoignition temperature)
