= Corn oil =

Oil from the seeds of corn

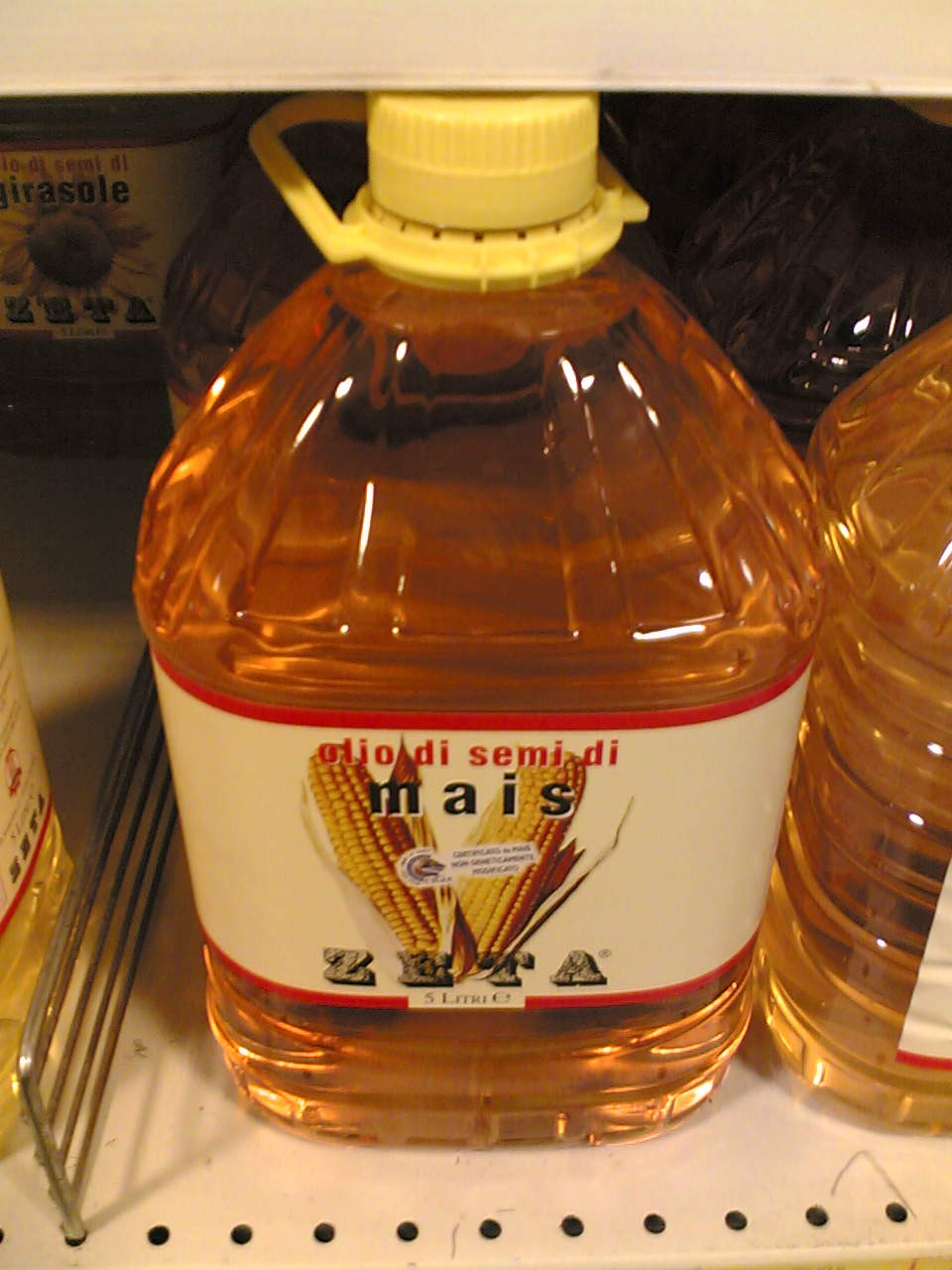

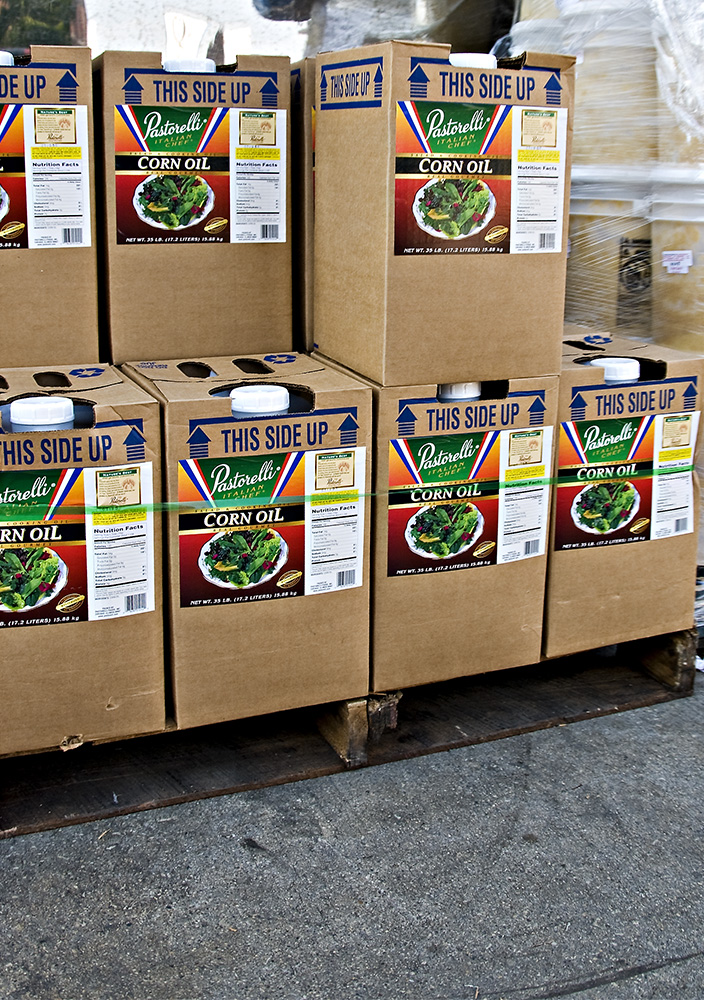
Plastic jugs in cardboard boxes, 15 kg each

Corn oil (North American) or maize oil (British) is oil extracted from the germ of corn (maize). Its main use is in cooking, where its high smoke point makes refined corn oil a valuable frying oil. It is also a key ingredient in some margarines. Corn oil is generally less expensive than most other types of vegetable oils.

Corn oil is also a feedstock used for biodiesel. Other industrial uses for corn oil include soap, salve, paint, erasers, rustproofing for metal surfaces, inks, textiles, nitroglycerin, and insecticides. It is sometimes used as a carrier for drug molecules in pharmaceutical preparations. Due to its low cost, corn oil is also one of the most popular choices for use in egg addling, an avian population control method in which a bird's egg is coated with oil to prevent the embryo from receiving oxygen.

== Production ==
Almost all corn oil is expeller-pressed, then solvent-extracted using hexane or 2-methylpentane (isohexane). The solvent is evaporated from the corn oil, recovered, and re-used. After extraction, the corn oil is then refined by degumming and/or alkali treatment, both of which remove phosphatides. Alkali treatment also neutralizes free fatty acids and removes color (bleaching). Final steps in refining include winterization (the removal of waxes), and deodorization by steam distillation of the oil at 232–260 °C (450–500 °F) under a high vacuum.

	Country	Production, 2018 (tonnes)
1	United States	1,707,600
2	China	483,700
3	Brazil	145,548
4	South Africa	83,700
5	Japan	82,503
6	Italy	69,300
7	France	67,900
8	Belgium	64,700
9	Canada	62,300
10	Turkey	53,000
Source : FAOSTAT

Maize oil production

Yearly per capita supply of maize oil

== Constituents and comparison ==
Properties of vegetable oils The nutritional values are expressed as percent (%) by mass of total fat.
Type	Processing treatment	Saturated fatty acids	Monounsaturated fatty acids		Polyunsaturated fatty acids				Smoke point
Type	Processing treatment	Saturated fatty acids	Total	Oleic acid (ω−9)	Total	α-Linolenic acid (ω−3)	Linoleic acid (ω−6)	ω−6:3 ratio	Smoke point
Avocado		11.6	70.6	67.9	13.5	1	12.5	12.5:1	250 °C (482 °F)
Brazil nut		17.6	26.7	26.1	55.7	0.1	55.6	457:1	208 °C (406 °F)
Canola		7.4	63.3	61.8	28.1	9.1	18.6	2:1	204 °C (400 °F)
Coconut		82.5	6.3	6	1.7	0.019	1.68	88:1	175 °C (347 °F)
Corn		12.9	27.6	27.3	54.7	1	58	58:1	232 °C (450 °F)
Cottonseed		25.9	17.8	19	51.9	1	54	54:1	216 °C (420 °F)
Cottonseed	hydrogenated	93.6	1.5		0.6	0.2	0.3	1.5:1	
Flaxseed/linseed		9.0	18.4	18	67.8	53	13	0.2:1	107 °C (225 °F)
Grape seed		9.6	16.1	15.8	69.9	0.10	69.6	very high	216 °C (421 °F)
Hemp seed		7.0	9.0	9.0	82.0	22.0	54.0	2.5:1	166 °C (330 °F)
High-oleic safflower oil		7.5	75.2	75.2	12.8	0	12.8	very high	212 °C (414 °F)
Olive (extra virgin)		13.8	73.0	71.3	10.5	0.7	9.8	14:1	193 °C (380 °F)
Palm		49.3	37.0	40	9.3	0.2	9.1	45.5:1	235 °C (455 °F)
Palm	hydrogenated	88.2	5.7		0				
Peanut		16.2	57.1	55.4	19.9	0.318	19.6	61.6:1	232 °C (450 °F)
Rice bran oil		25	38.4	38.4	36.6	2.2	34.4	15.6:1	232 °C (450 °F)
Sesame		14.2	39.7	39.3	41.7	0.3	41.3	138:1	
Soybean		15.6	22.8	22.6	57.7	7	51	7.3:1	238 °C (460 °F)
Soybean	partially hydrogenated	14.9	43.0	42.5	37.6	2.6	34.9	13.4:1	
Sunflower oil		8.99	63.4	62.9	20.7	0.16	20.5	128:1	227 °C (440 °F)
Walnut oil	unrefined	9.1	22.8	22.2	63.3	10.4	52.9	5:1	160 °C (320 °F)

- Of the saturated fatty acids, 80% are palmitic acid (lipid number of C16:0), 14% stearic acid (C18:0), and 3% arachidic acid (C20:0).
- Over 99% of the monounsaturated fatty acids are oleic acid (C18:1 cis-9)
- 98% of the polyunsaturated fatty acids are the omega-6 linoleic acid (C18:2 n-6).

== See also ==
- Corn wet-milling
