= Peanut oil =

Vegetable oil derived from peanuts

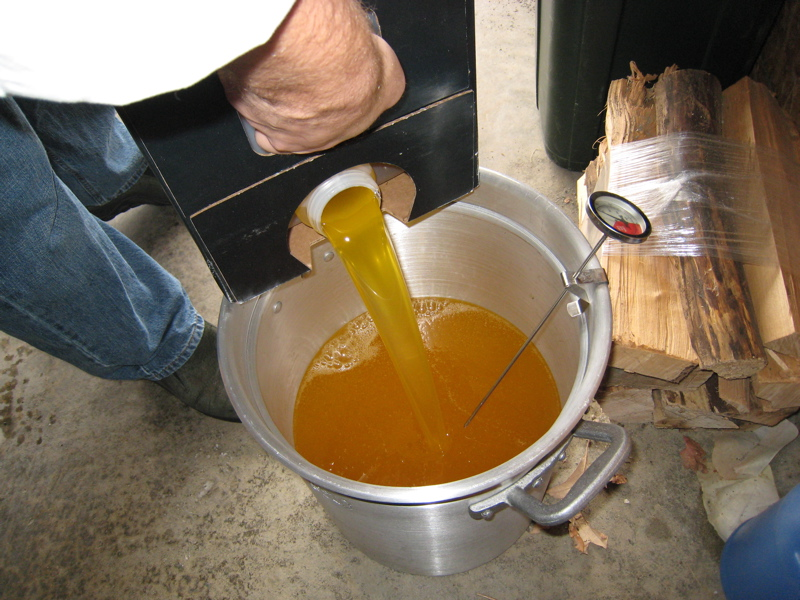
Peanut oil

Peanut oil, also known as groundnut oil or arachis oil, is a vegetable oil derived from peanuts. The oil usually has a mild or neutral flavor but, if made with roasted peanuts, has a stronger peanut flavor and aroma. It is commonly used in numerous cuisines worldwide, both for general cooking and for added flavor. Peanut oil has a high smoke point relative to many other cooking oils, so is favorable for frying foods.

== History ==
Due to war shortages of other oils, the use of readily available peanut oil increased in the United States during World War II.

== Production ==
Production of peanut oil 2023, tonnes
India	2,309,000
China	1,848,600
Nigeria	390,500
Myanmar	242,800
Sudan	159,000
United States	96,000
World	6,430,827
Source: FAOSTAT of the United Nations

In 2023, world production of peanut oil (reported as groundnut oil) was 6.4 million tonnes, led by India and China with 64% of the total when combined (table). Nigeria and Myanmar were secondary producers.

Groundnut oil production

Yearly per capita supply of groundnut oil

== Uses ==
Unrefined peanut oil is used as a flavorant for dishes akin to sesame oil. Refined peanut oil is commonly used for frying volume batches of foods like French fries and has a smoke point of 450 °F/232 °C.

Unrefined peanut oil is commonly used for cooking due to its natural flavor and nutritional benefits. It's also used in skincare products for its moisturizing properties.

Unrefined peanut oil is often used in salad dressings and marinades for its rich, nutty taste.

=== Biodiesel ===
At the 1900 Paris Exhibition, the Otto Company, at the request of the French Government, demonstrated that peanut oil could be used as a source of fuel for the diesel engine; this was one of the earliest demonstrations of biodiesel technology.

Crude peanut oil can be filtered and placed in a reaction tank with methanol and sodium hydroxide to yield methyl ester - the Biodiesel fuel.

=== Other uses ===
Peanut oil, as with other vegetable oils, can be used to make soap by the process of saponification. Peanut oil is safe for use as a massage oil.

== Fat composition and nutrition ==
Peanut oil is 16% saturated fat, 57% monounsaturated fat, and 20% polyunsaturated fat. In a reference amount of 100 g (3.5 oz) (as ml), peanut oil supplies 884 calories of food energy. It is a rich source of vitamin E, with no other micronutrients in significant amounts, and contains no protein or carbohydrates.

Properties of common cooking fats (per 100 g)
Type of fat	Total fat (g)	Saturated fat (g)	Monounsaturated fat (g)	Polyunsaturated fat (g)	Smoke point
Butter	81	51	21	3	150 °C (302 °F)
Canola oil	100	6–7	62–64	24–26	205 °C (401 °F)
Coconut oil	99	83	6	2	177 °C (351 °F)
Corn oil	100	13–14	27–29	52–54	230 °C (446 °F)
Lard	100	39	45	11	190 °C (374 °F)
Peanut oil	100	16	57	20	225 °C (437 °F)
Olive oil	100	13–19	59–74	6–16	190 °C (374 °F)
Rice bran oil	100	25	38	37	250 °C (482 °F)
Soybean oil	100	15	22	57–58	257 °C (495 °F)
Suet	94	52	32	3	200 °C (392 °F)
Ghee	99	62	29	4	204 °C (399 °F)
Sunflower oil	100	10	20	66	225 °C (437 °F)
Sunflower oil (high oleic)	100	12	84	4	
Vegetable shortening	100	25	41	28	165 °C (329 °F)

== Health issues ==
=== Toxins ===
If quality control is neglected, peanuts that contain the mold that produces highly toxic aflatoxin can end up contaminating the oil derived from them.

=== Allergens ===
Those allergic to peanuts can consume highly refined peanut oil, but should avoid first-press, organic oil. Most highly refined peanut oils remove the peanut allergens and have been shown to be safe for "the vast majority of peanut-allergic individuals". However, cold-pressed peanut oils may not remove the allergens and thus could be highly dangerous to people with peanut allergy.

Since the degree of processing for any particular product is often unclear, many believe that "avoidance is prudent".
