= List of avocado dishes =

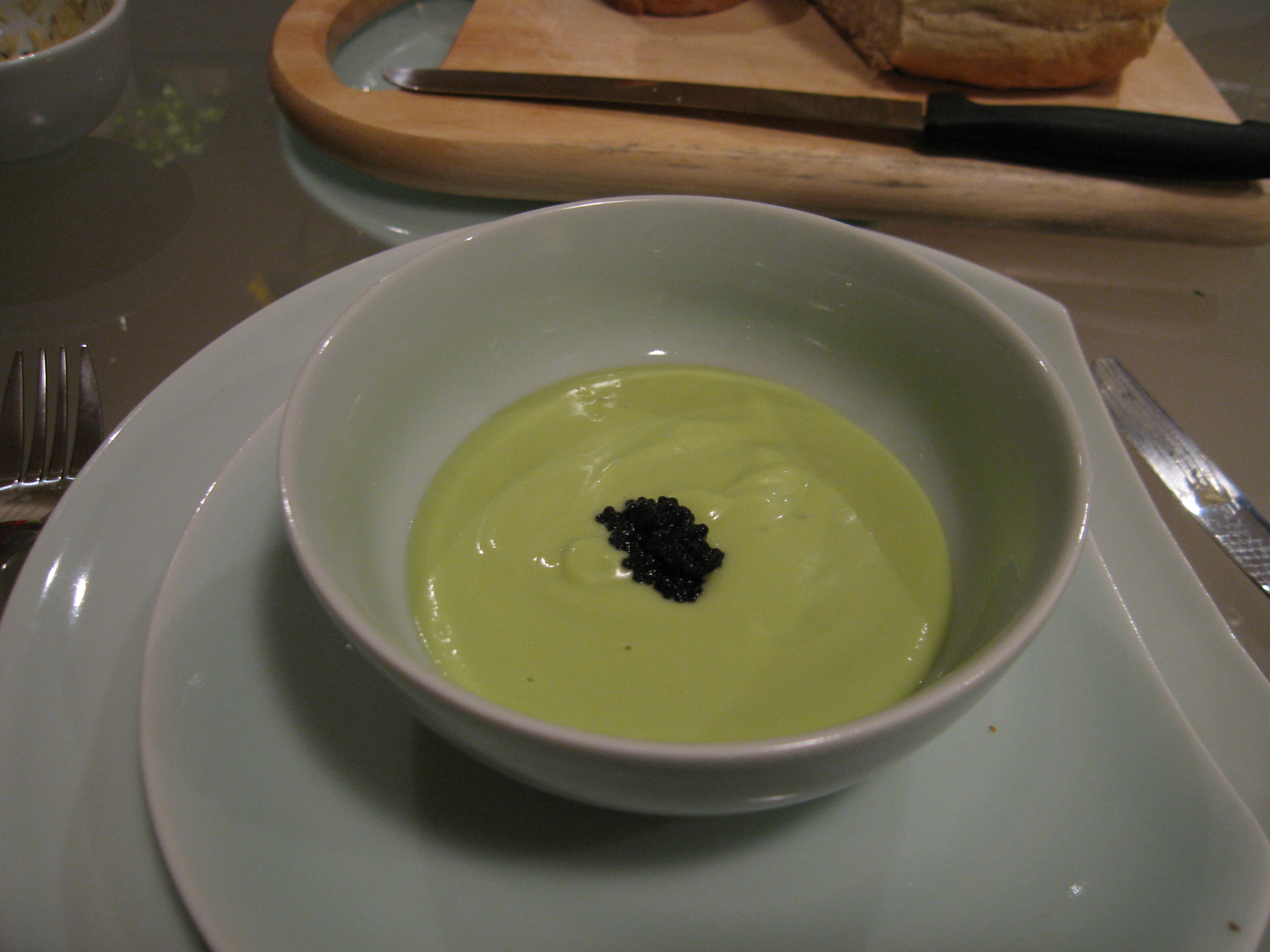
Avocado soup garnished with caviar

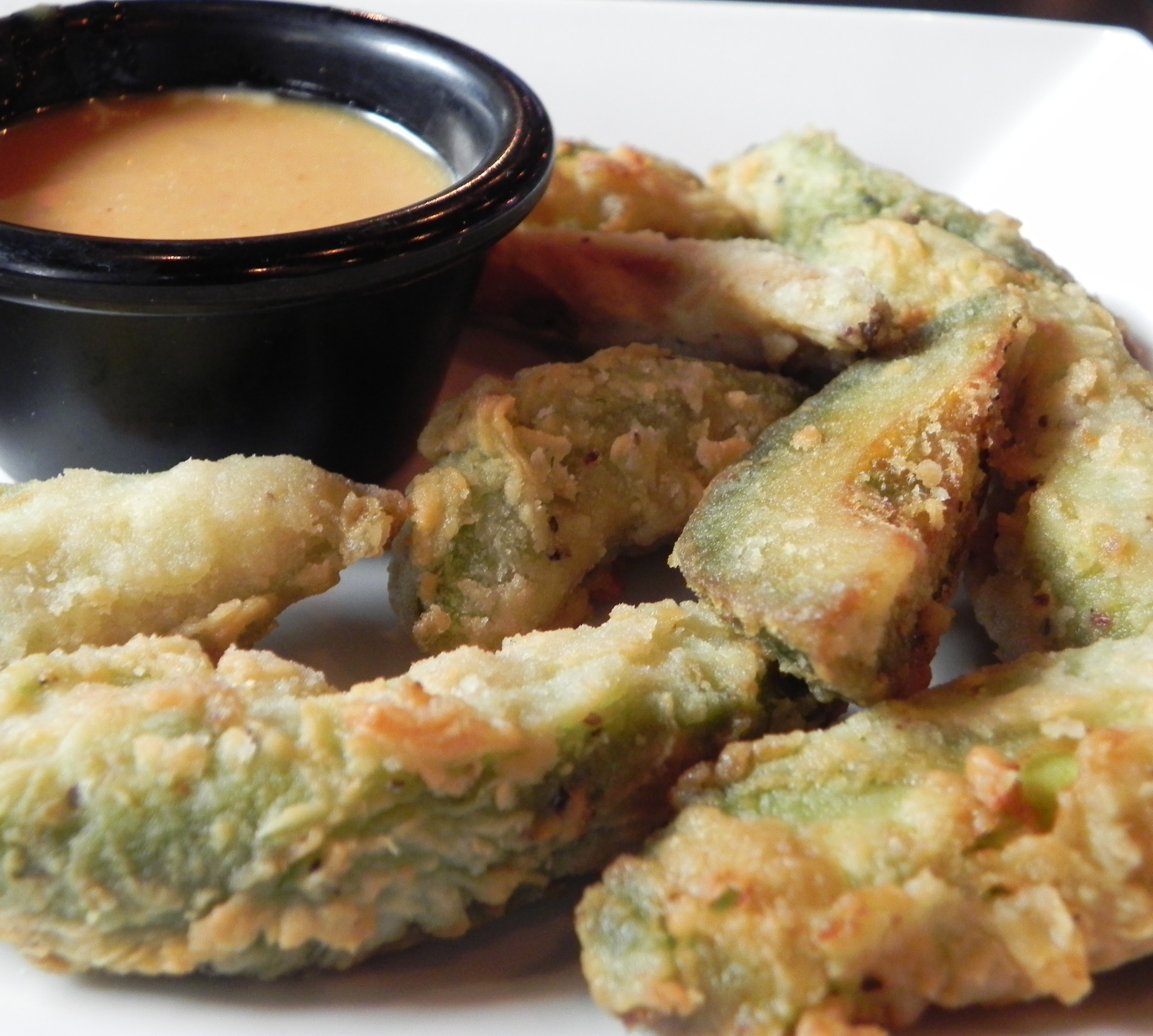
Avocado fries with a dipping sauce

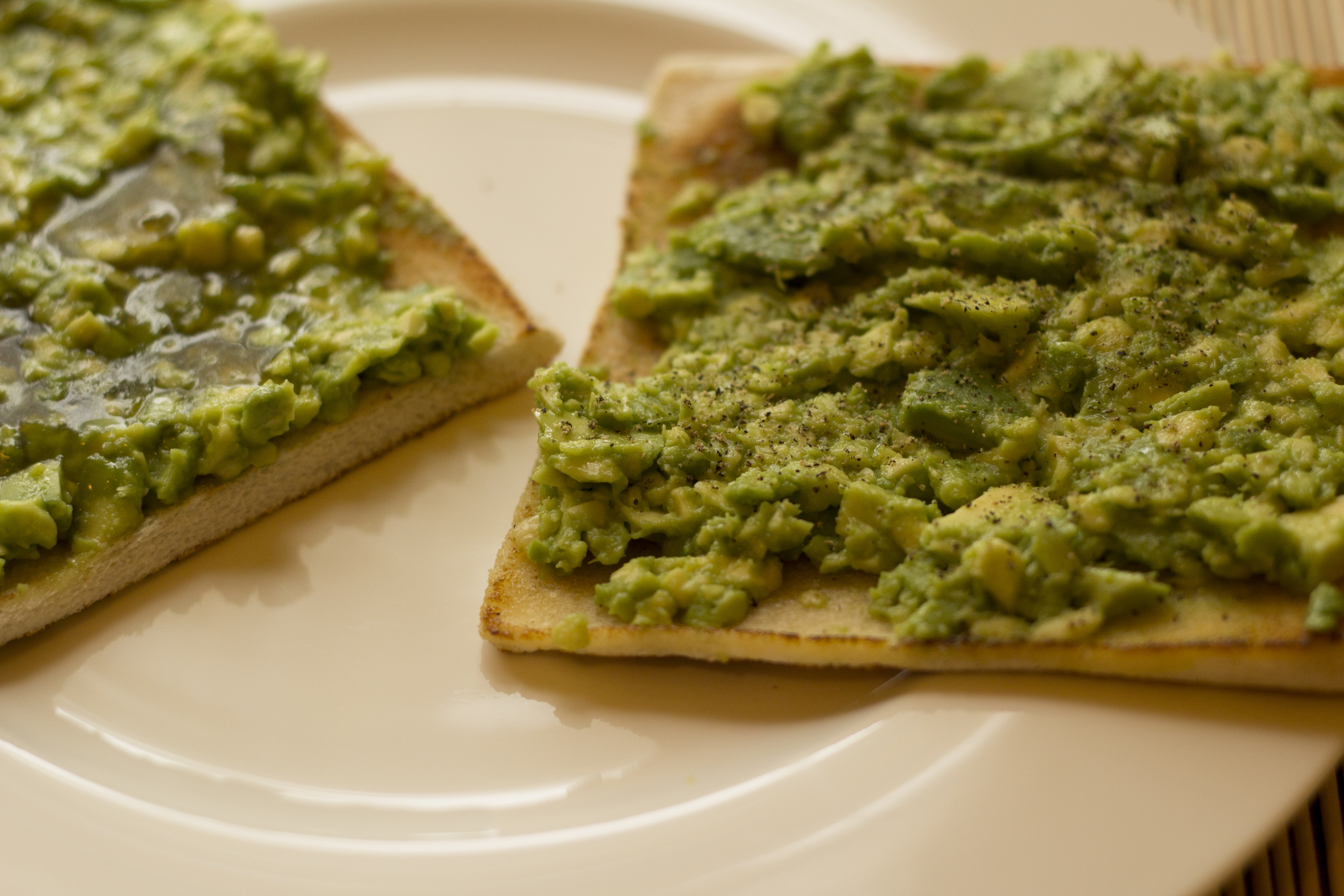
Avocado toast

This is a list of notable avocado dishes and foods, comprising dishes and foods prepared using avocado as a primary ingredient.

== Avocado dishes ==
- Avocado and milk in ice (abukado lamaw) – a traditional Filipino dessert made from avocado chunks in milk and sugar, served chilled.
- Avocado bread
- Avocado smoothie (Sinh Tố Bơ) - A Vietnamese traditional dessert and beverage made from blended avocado with milk, sweet condensed milk and crushed ice.
- Avocado fries – a type of fries dish prepared using avocado instead of potatoes.
- Avocado oil – used as an ingredient in other dishes and as a cooking oil.
- Avocado salad
- Avocado sauce – a mass-produced product.
- Avocado cream – a type of avocado sauce that can be prepared using mashed avocados, cream or sour cream, and other ingredients.
- Avocado key lime pie – an uncooked pie made with sweetened avocado, coconut cream and key lime juice in a baked chopped nut and date crust
- Avocado soup – can be prepared and served cold or hot
- Avocado toast – an open sandwich prepared using mashed avocado on toast.
- Avocado tofu donburi – an Asian "rice bowl dish" consisting of avocado, tofu, okra or other ingredients simmered together and served over rice.
- Deep-fried avocado – avocado that has been breaded or battered and deep-fried. The dish can be stuffed with meats, cheese and other ingredients.
- Féroce – also referred to as "féroce d'avocat", it is prepared using mashed avocados, olive oil and lime juice, with salt cod, garlic, chili peppers, hot sauce and seasonings blended in. It can be used as a spread on various foods. Other seafoods can be used to prepare féroce, and it is a popular dish in Martinique, an insular region of France.
- Guacamole – an avocado-based dip or salad first created by the Aztecs in what is now Mexico.
- Guasacaca – a Venezuelan avocado-based sauce.
- Stuffed avocado
- Western-style sushi
  - California roll
  - Rainbow roll
  - Seattle roll
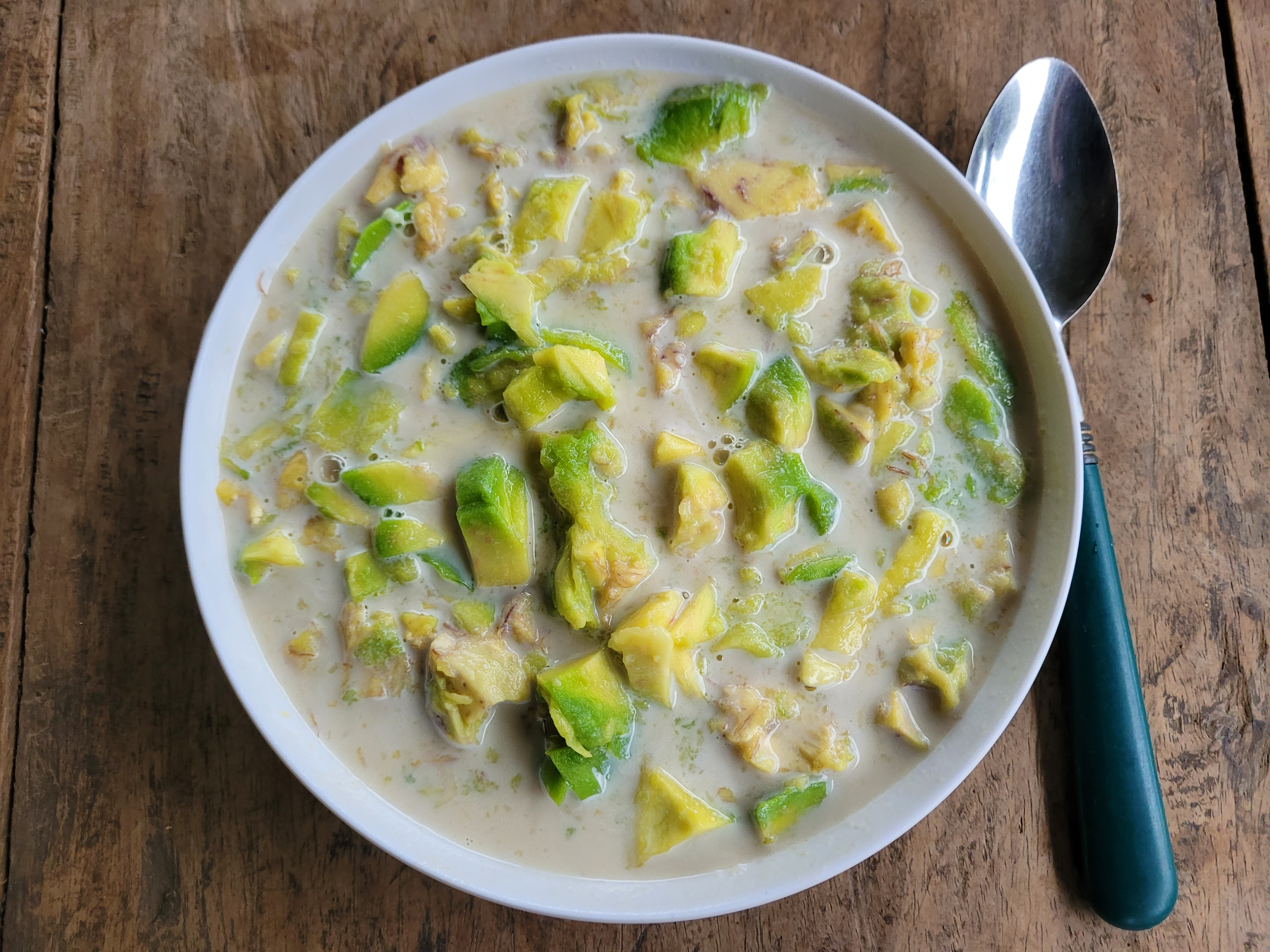
Avocado and milk in ice (abukado lamaw)

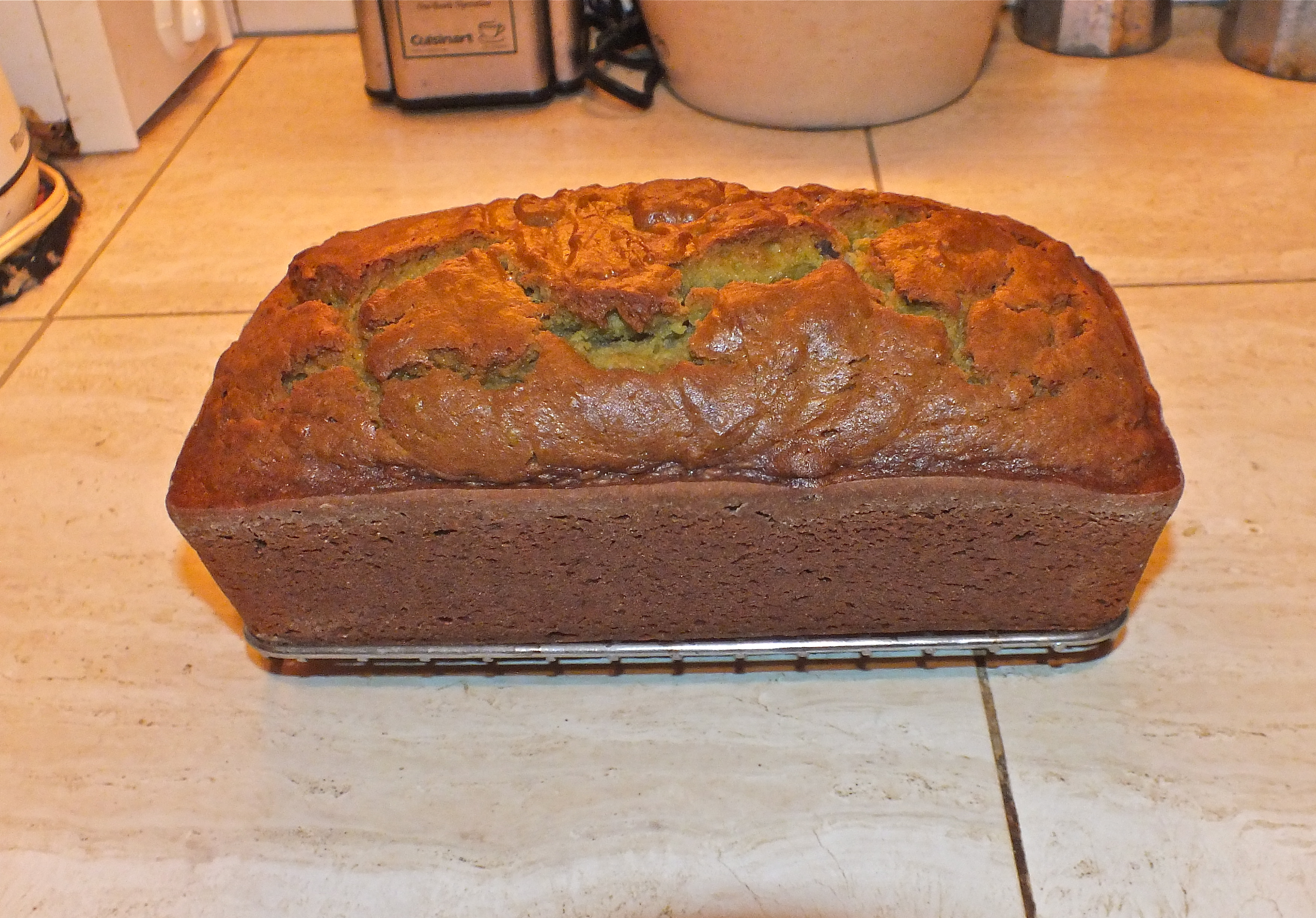
Avocado bread

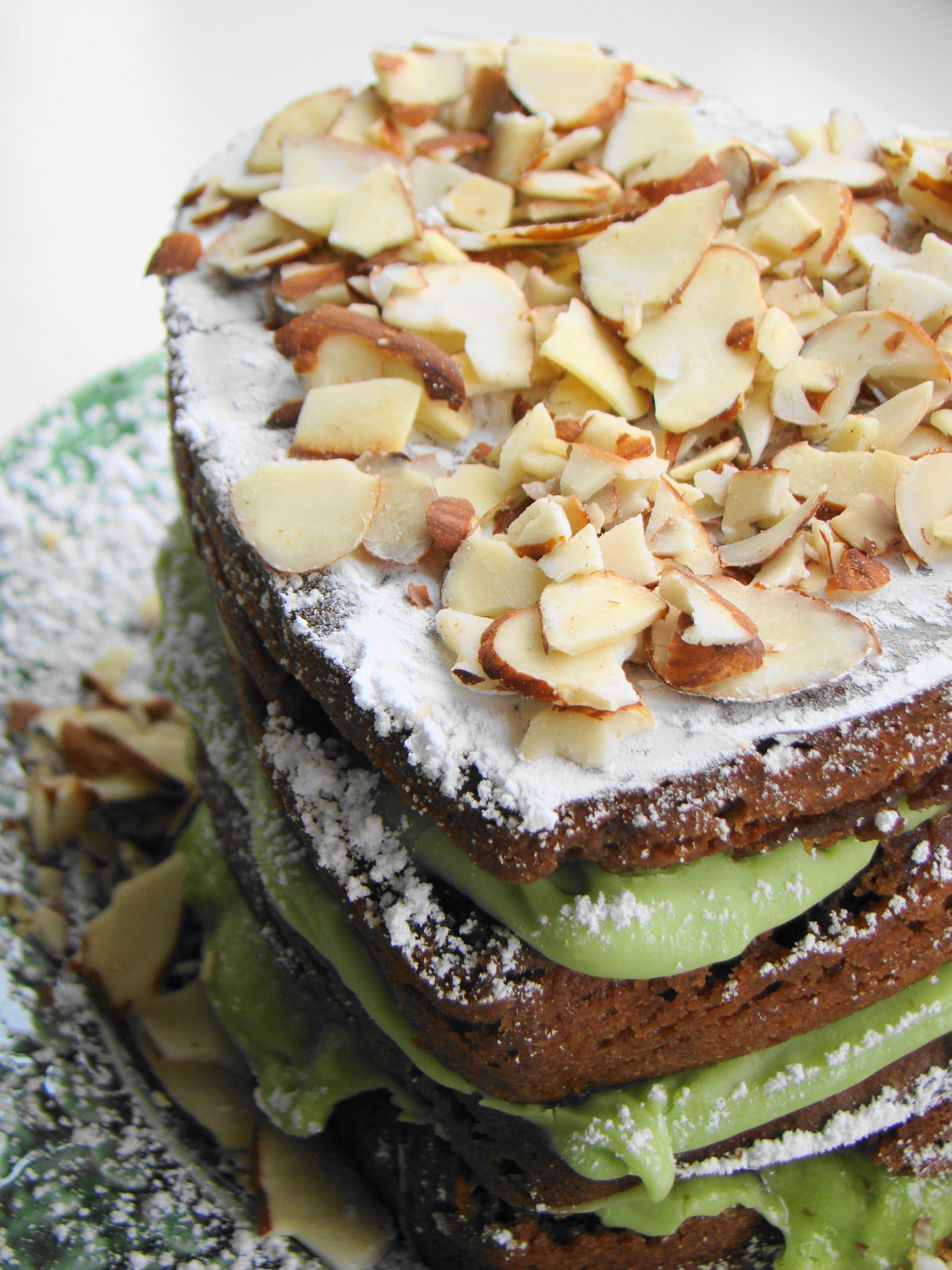
Mocha almond fudge avocado cake

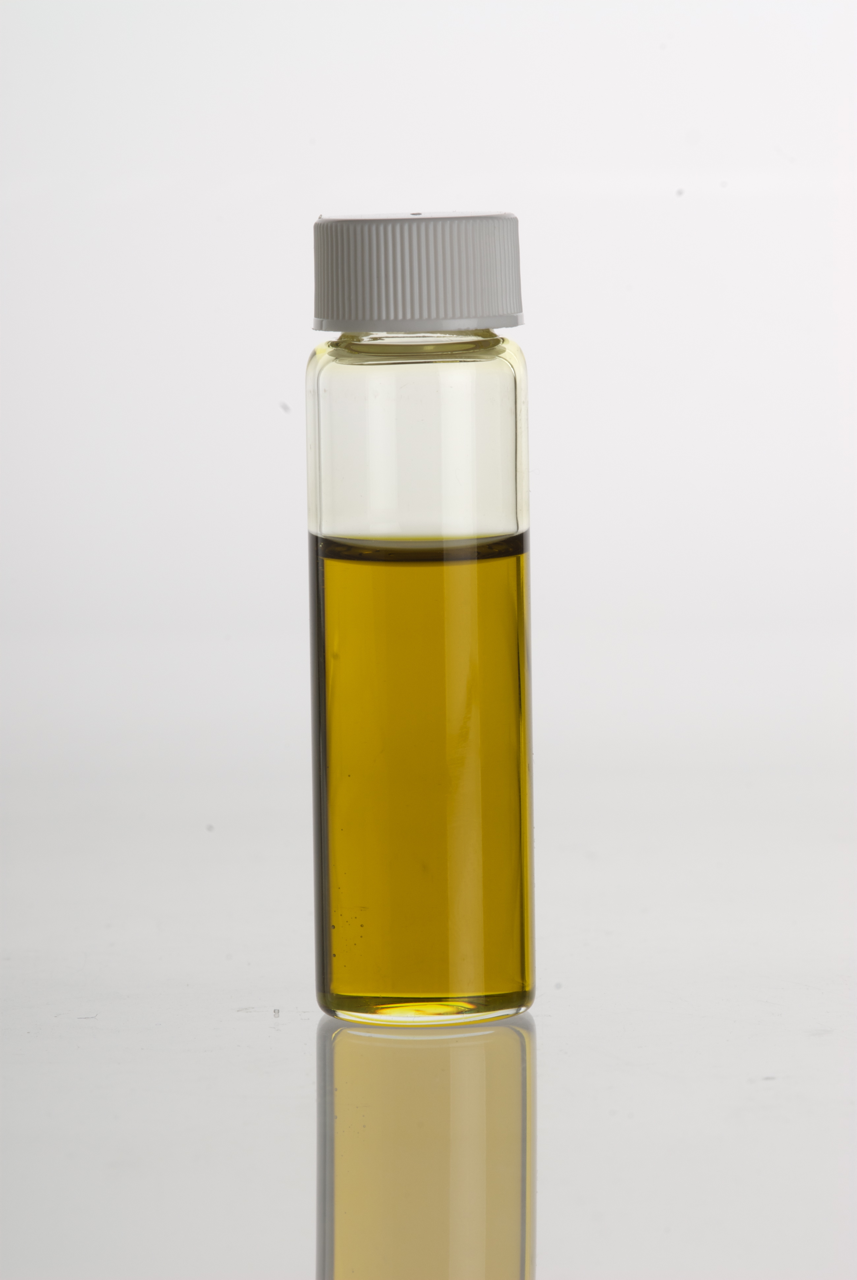
Avocado oil

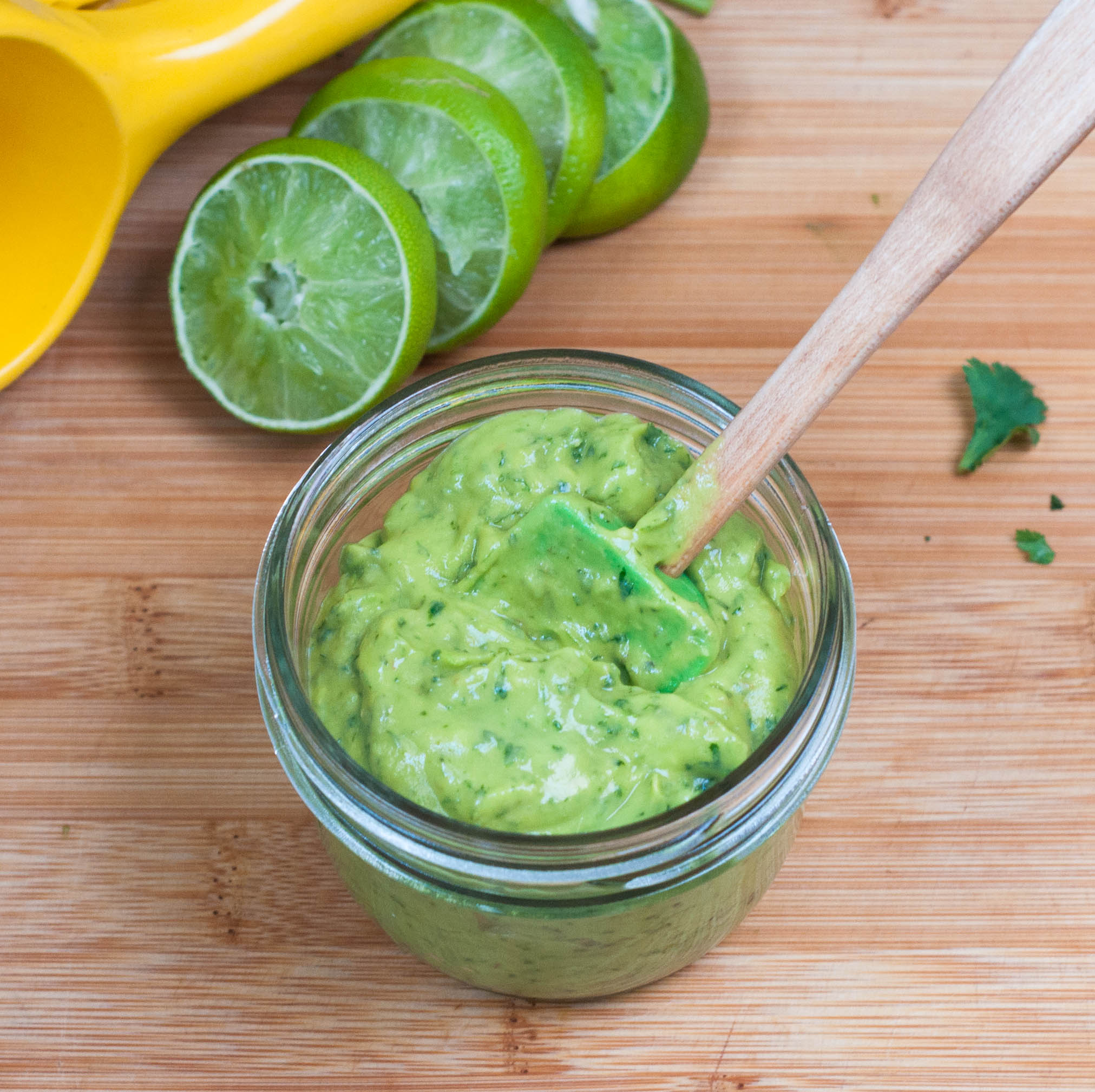
Avocado sauce prepared with lime

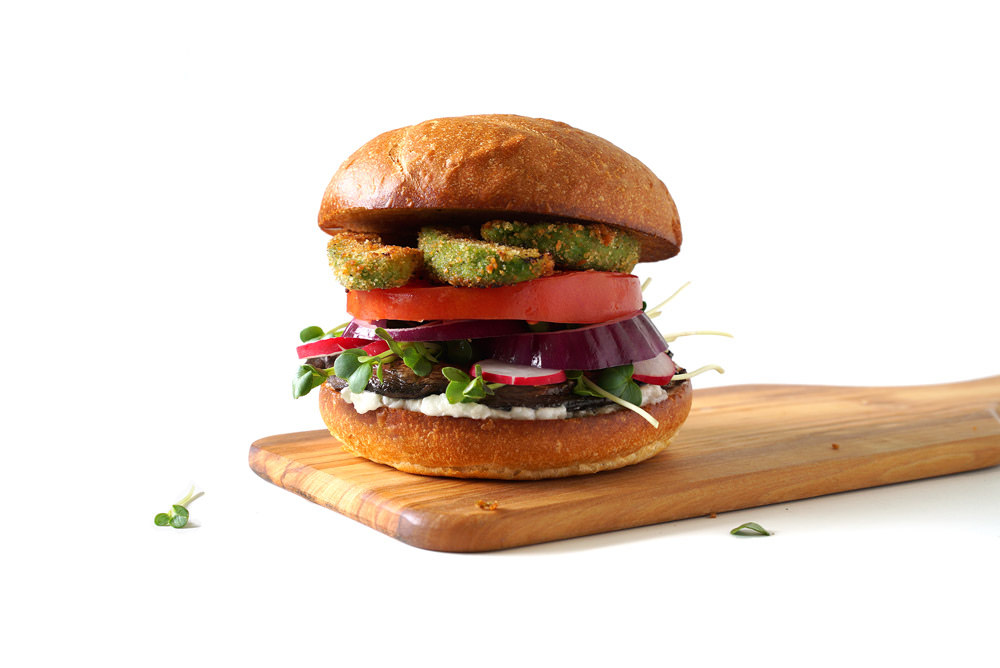
A veggie burger with deep-fried avocado (below the top bun)

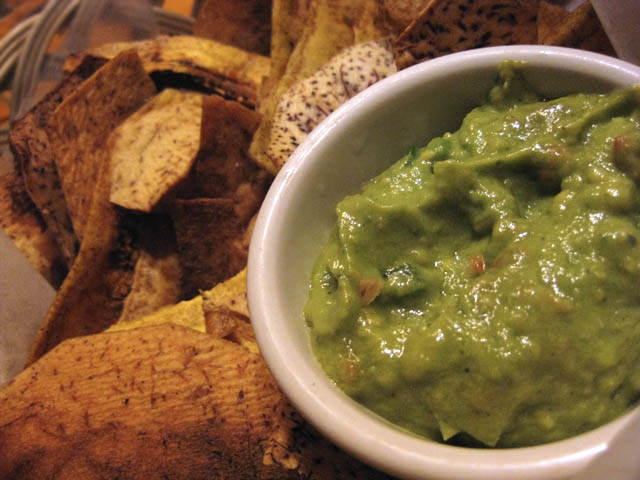
Guasacaca and tortilla chips

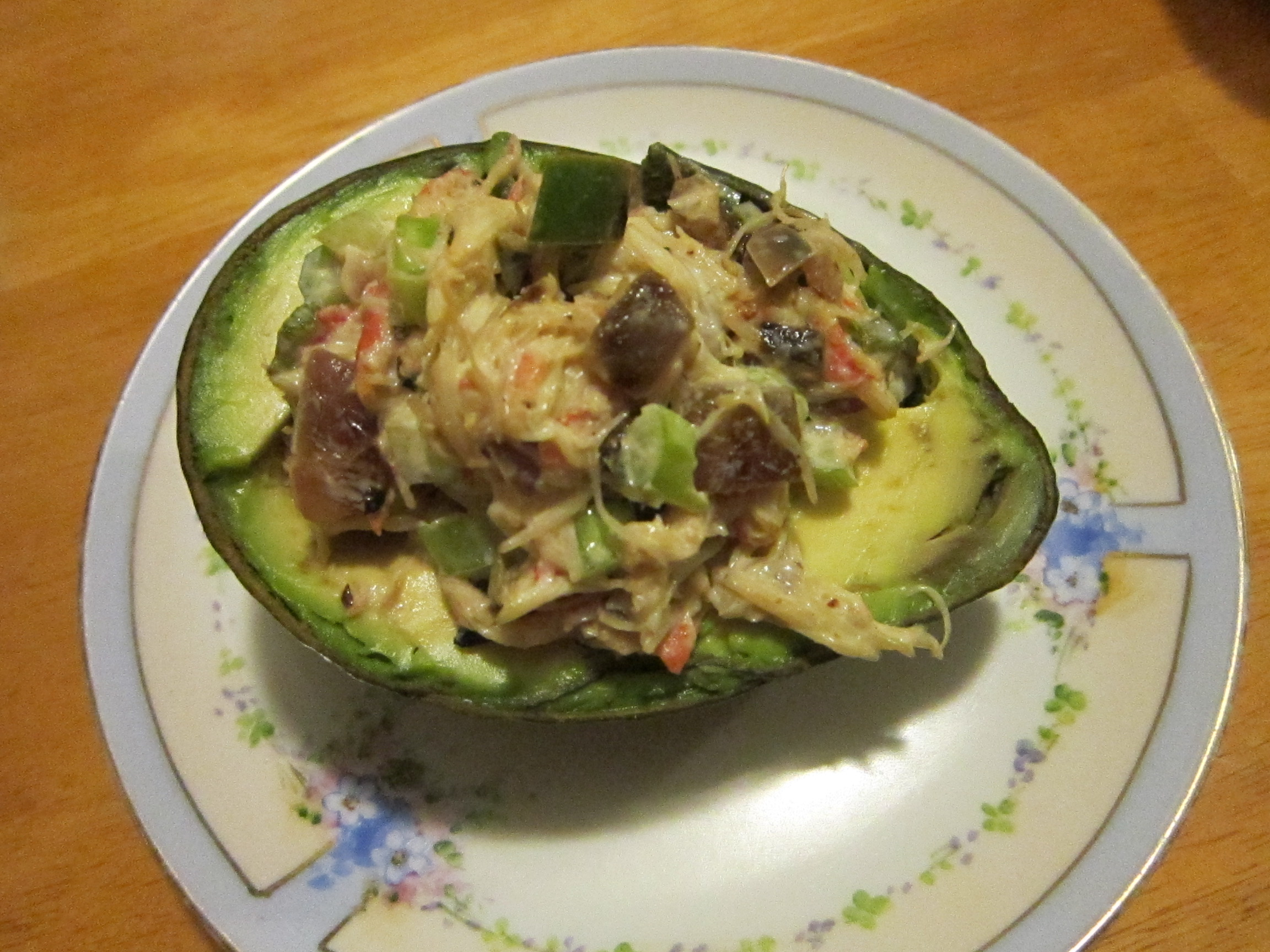
A stuffed avocado

== Beverages ==
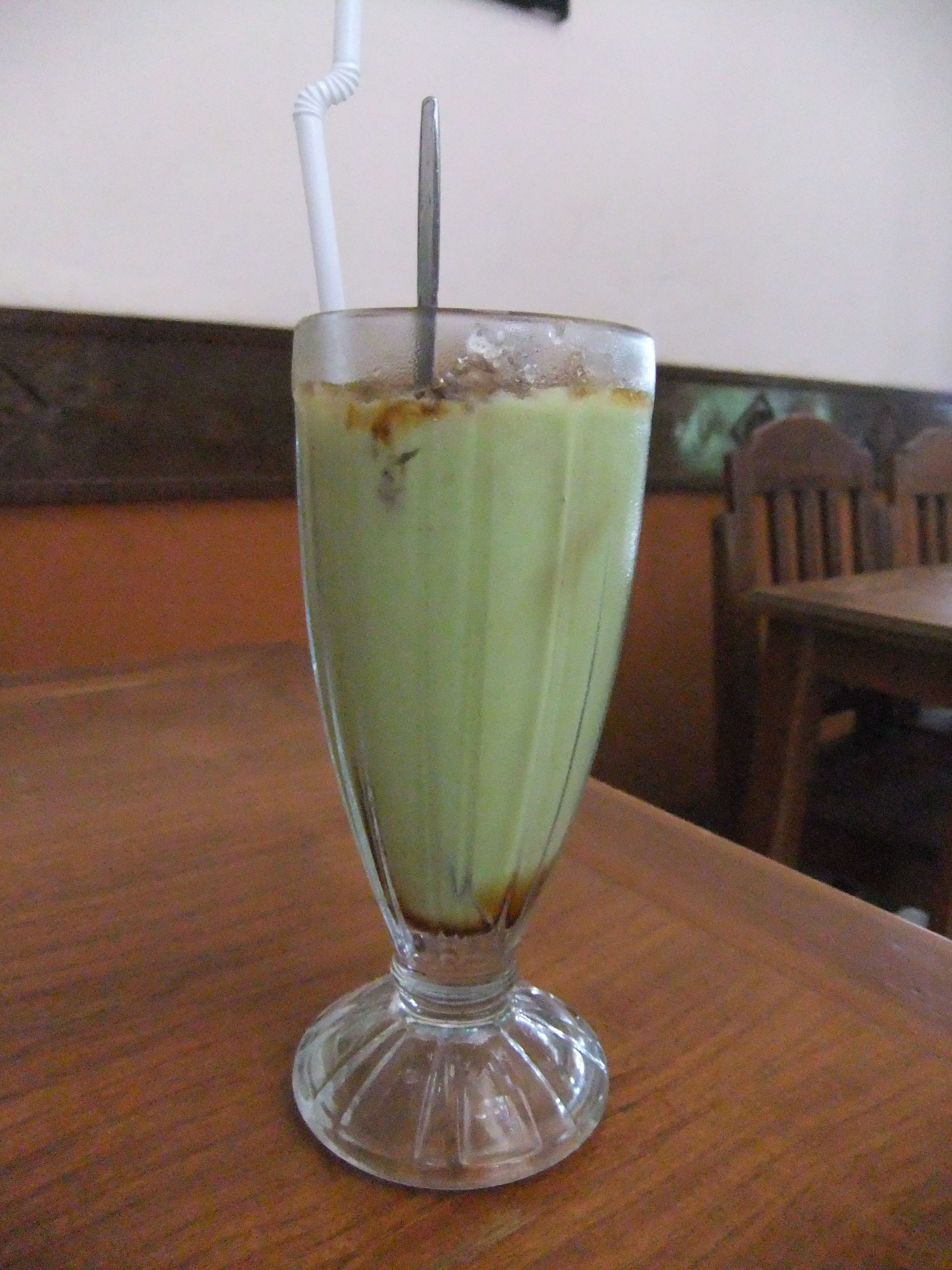
Jus alpukat

- Avocado smoothie (also called "avocado shake") – the Vietnamese avocado smoothie (Sinh Tố Bơ) is made from sweet condensed milk, milk and crushed ice, but the avocado is blended or mashed.
- Avocado margarita – a margarita prepared with muddled or blended avocado. Guacamole can be used in its preparation.
- Avolatte – a milk coffee in the shell of an avocado, with avocado flesh (originally a joke).
- Jus alpukat – literally means avocado juice. An Indonesian drink.

== See also ==
- List of butter dishes
- Lists of foods
- Veganism
