= Tamashiro Market =

Fish and seafood market in Honolulu

Coordinates: 21°19′19″N 157°52′01″W

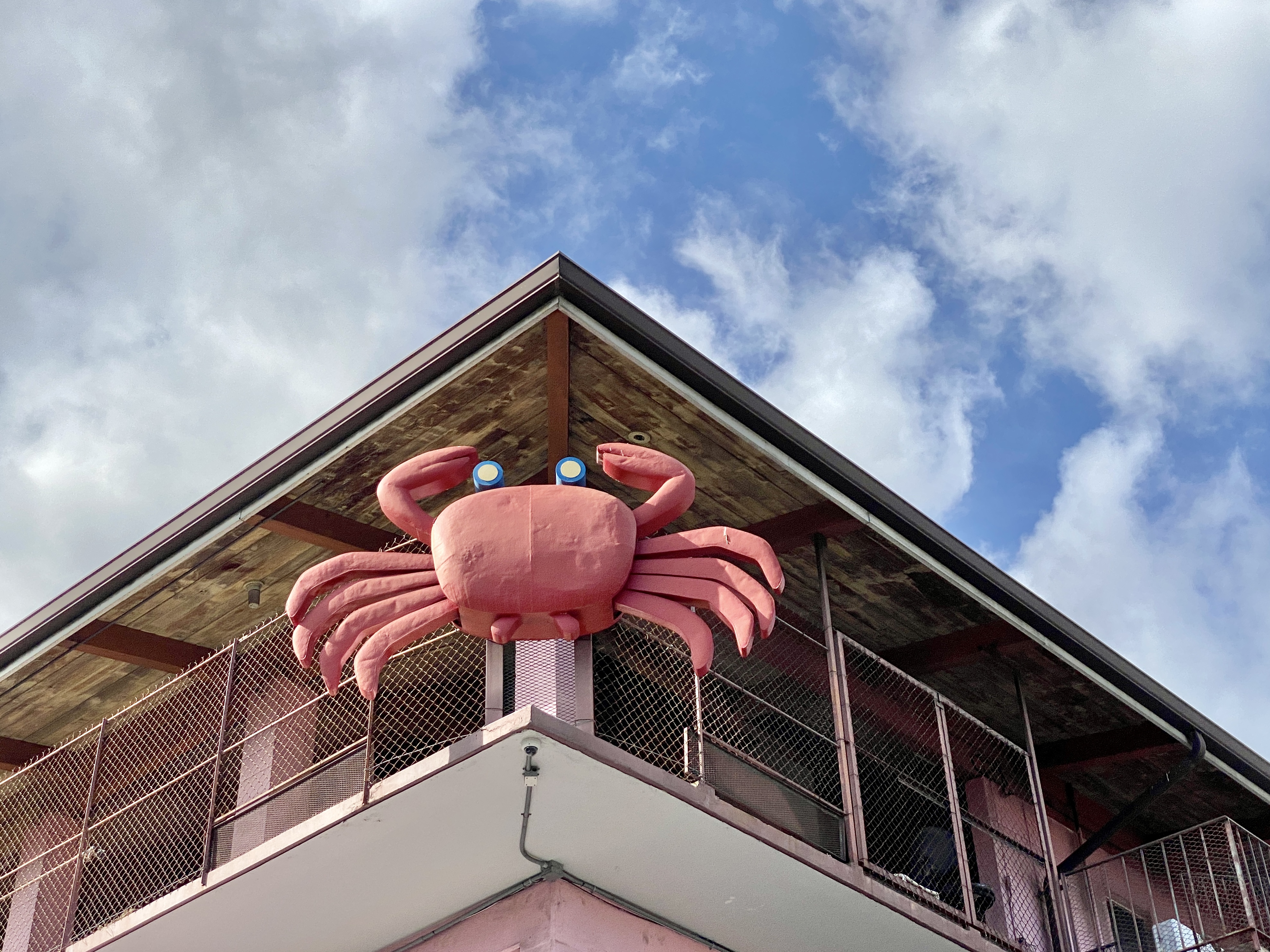
Crab sign on Tamashiro Market

Tamashiro Market is a family-run seafood market located in Downtown Honolulu on North King Street for over 60 years. It was founded by Walter Tamashiro after a tsumani hit Hilo in 1946, where the Tamashiro family previously lived. Fresh fish sales are 75 percent of the market's business. The market also sells prepared poké, fish jerky, various sea vegetables and edible seaweeds, and a range of tropical fruits.

== History ==
In 1913, Chogen Tamashiro emigrated to Hawaii from Okinawa, Japan. He was 14 years old at the time, and came to Hawaii to work on a sugar plantation, which he eventually purchased some decades later. Tamashiro and his wife Iris Yohiko had a son, Walter, on December 11, 1929 in Hilo.

The elder Tamashiro first opened Tamashiro Market in 1941, a farm store in Hilo, however after a 1946 tsunami destroyed much of Hilo, he and his family moved to Oahu, to open the market in Honolulu. In 1954, his son, Walter, considered the viability of focusing the market on fish and seafood. The market began selling live crab and varieties of fresh fish from metal buckets. Once the day's catch sells out, customers must wait until the next day to make fish purchases.

Walter Tamashiro died on August 15, 2002. The market is now run by Walter's three sons, Cyrus, Guy, and Sean, making it a three-generation family business. Sean Tamashiro passed away in February 2021.

On March 27th, 2026, it was announced that Tamashiro Market would be closing after nearly 80 years.

== Description ==
The market building is painted bright pink, and features a large pink crab near the roofline. It is located on North King Street, approximately one mile from the largest fish auction house in the United States, the Honolulu Fish Auction. Each morning the Tamashiro brothers purchase the seafood and fish they will sell that day. The market offers more than 20 varieties of freshly made poké including nairagi, kajiki, tako, ahi with onions, spicy poké with tobiko, and kawa kawa among others. Tamashiro's king crab with nori poké won the Honolulu PokéFest contest in 2018.

== See also ==
- Honolulu Fish Auction
