= Féroce =

Martinican avocado dish

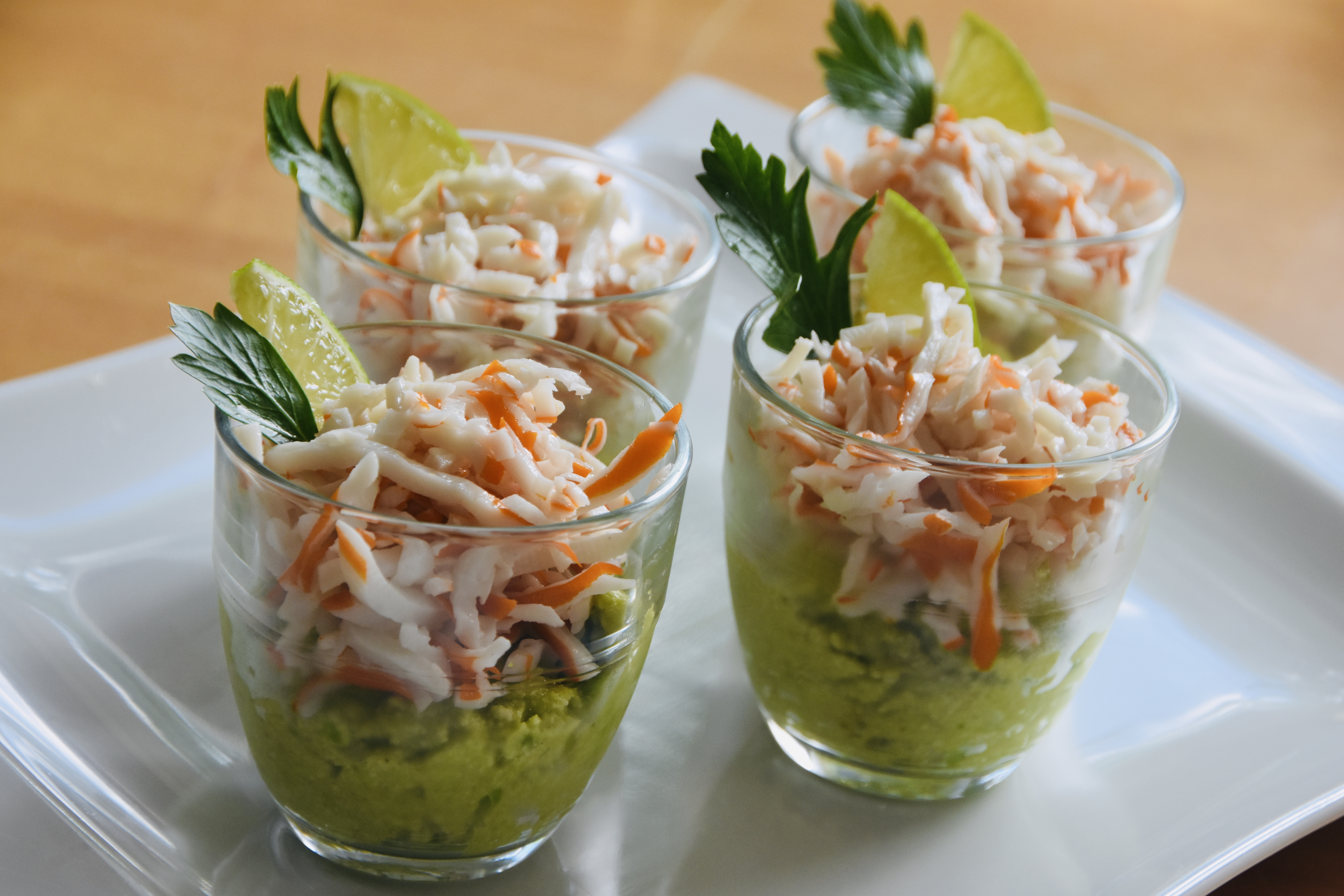
Féroce served with surimi fish sticks

Féroce, also referred to as féroce d'avocat (English: "fierce avocado"), is prepared using mashed avocados, cassava, olive oil and lime juice, with salt cod, garlic, chili peppers, hot sauce and seasonings blended in. It is a spicy dish that can also be used as a spread on various foods. Other seafood such as crab can be used to prepare féroce, and it is a popular dish in Martinique, an insular region of France.

== See also ==
- List of avocado dishes
- List of spreads
- Martinique § Cuisine
