= Avocado sauce =

Sauce prepared using avocado as a primary ingredient

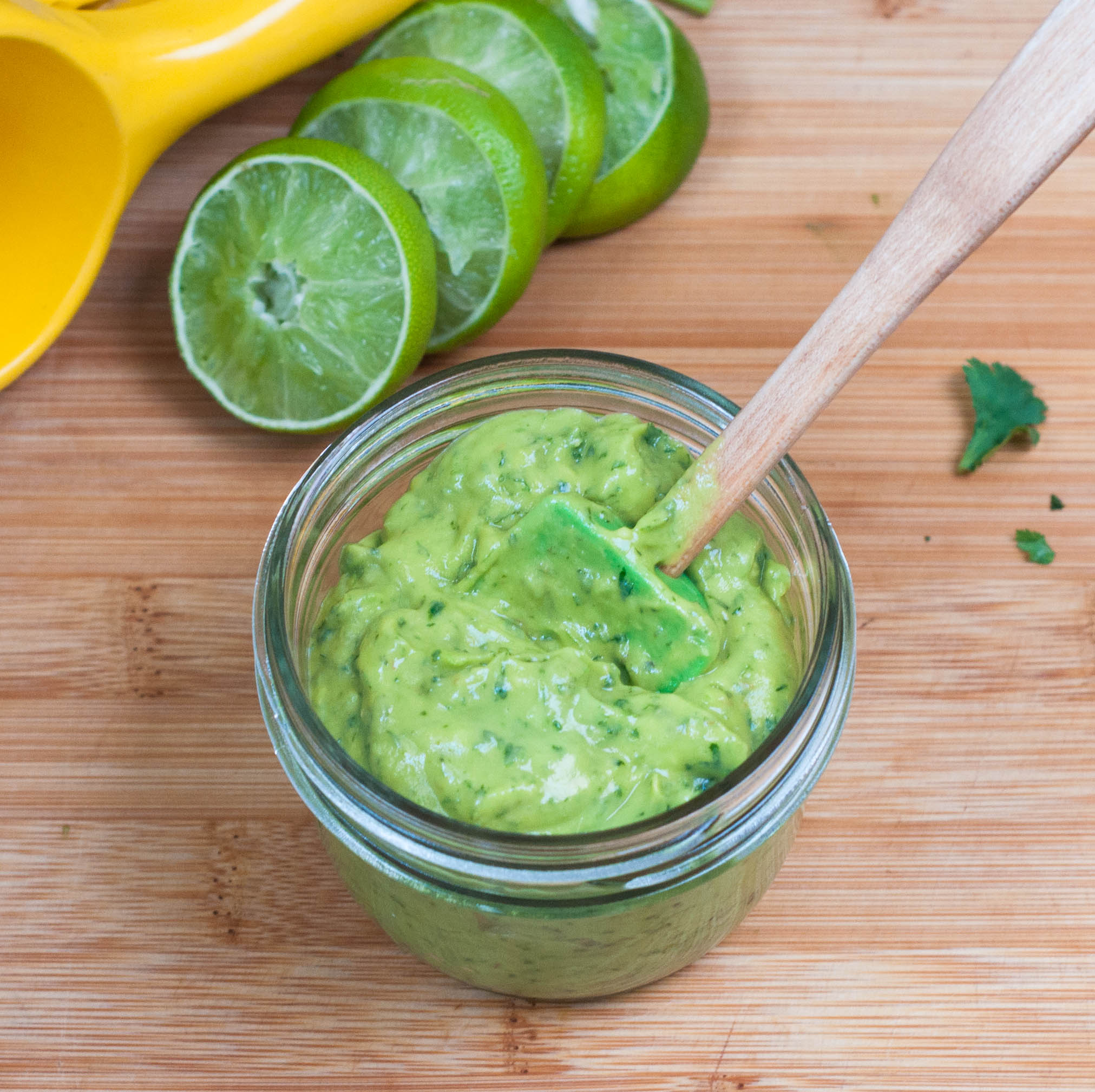
Avocado sauce prepared with lime

Avocado sauce is a sauce prepared using avocado as a primary ingredient. Commercial sauces are typically prepared to have a thin, pourable consistency. Popular brands include Kumana and Herdez.

== Preparation ==
Commercial preparation involves mixing the avocado using high-speed blenders, which breaks up the pulp. Spices, water and emulsifiers are added, and the resulting product is then typically frozen to prevent browning. Additional ingredients can include tomatillo, onion, chili peppers, cilantro, pepper and garlic.

One possible preparation of homemade avocado sauce involves blending yogurt, avocado, lemon juice, vegetable oil, crushed garlic, sugar, cumin, seasoning salt and red pepper sauce.

Avocado sauce is used as an ingredient and topping for meat dishes and dishes such as fajitas, taquitos and tacos, among others.

== See also ==
- Guacamole
- List of avocado dishes
- List of sauces
