= Seattle roll =

Sushi roll originating in Seattle, Washington, U.S.

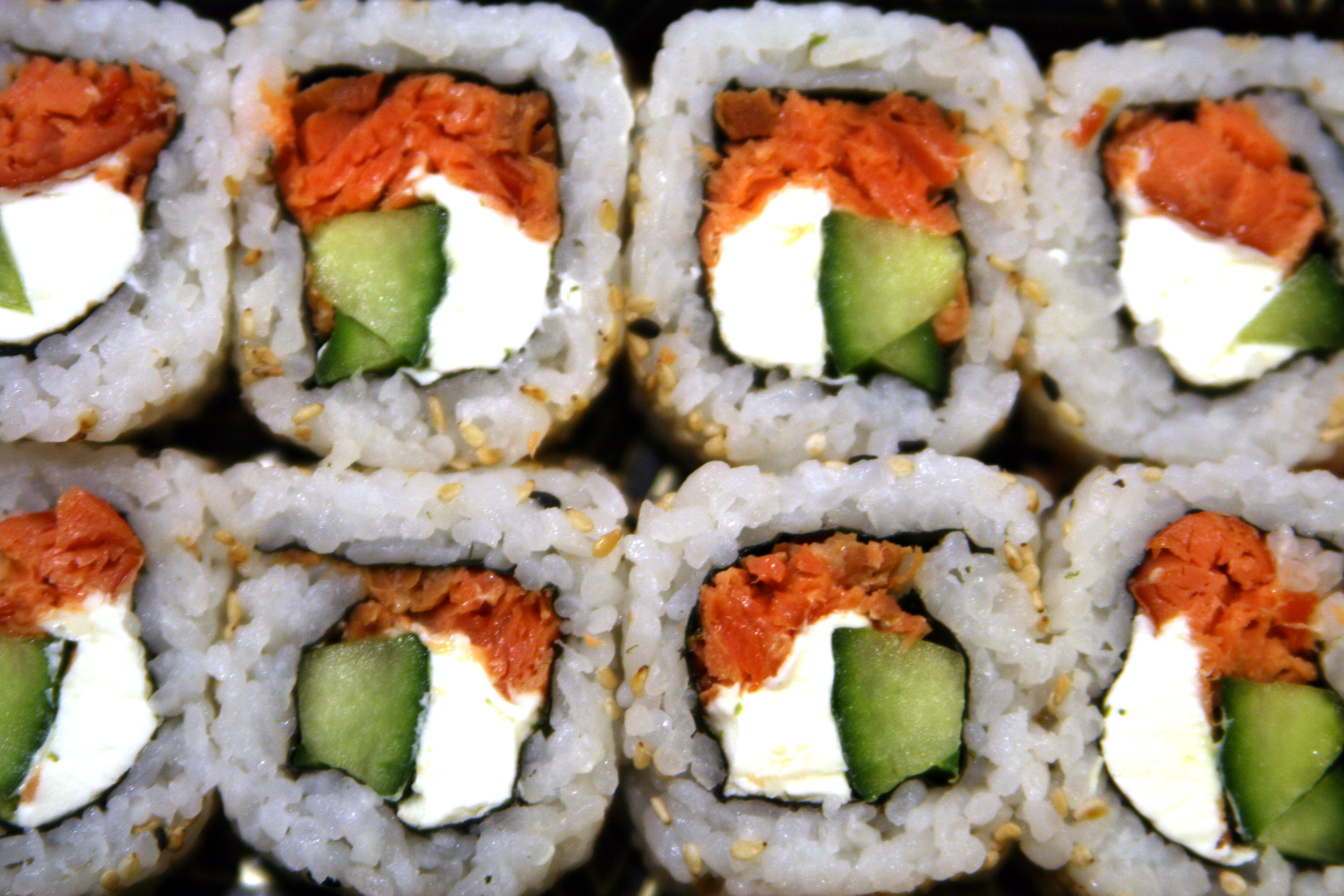
- Place of origin: Seattle, Washington, United States
- Main ingredients: Rice, cucumber, salmon, cream cheese, and seaweed

A Seattle roll is a makizushi roll similar to the Philadelphia roll. The fundamental recipe consists of raw salmon and cream cheese, usually along with cucumber and/or avocado, and sometimes masago or tobiko. Variations include ingredients such as smoked or seared salmon. Noted by Seattle food critics, it can be found at numerous restaurants in Seattle. Like many Western-inspired sushi rolls, the ingredients and name are based on an American market.
