= Honolulu Fish Auction =

Fish auction in Honolulu

Coordinates: 21.31794°N 157.87758°W

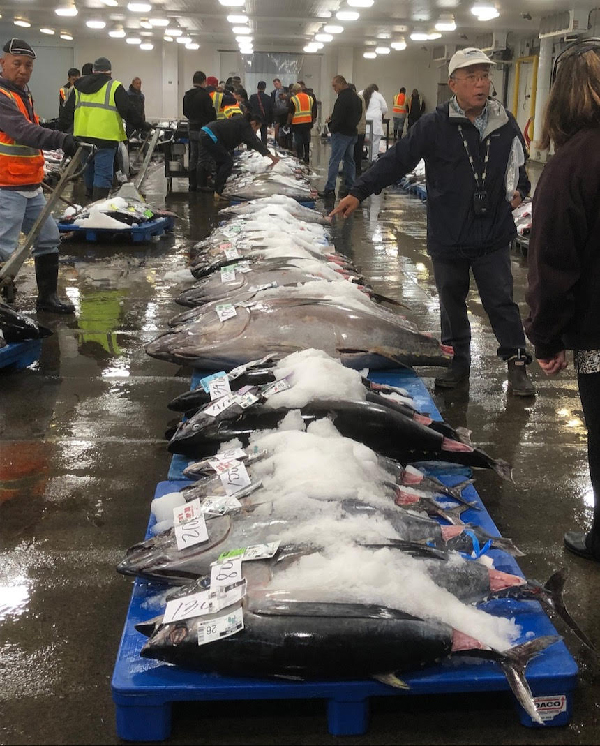
Honolulu Fish Auction

Honolulu Fish Auction has been operating since 1952, selling between 70,000 and 90,000 pounds of fish per day, operating six days per week. It is the sole large-scale auction for tuna west of Tokyo, Japan, and its operations are based on the same system used at the former Tsukiji Market Auction in Tokyo. The largest fish auction to the east is in Maine, United States, and is the only tuna auction in the U.S.

In addition to tuna the auction sells a variety of fish of different species, including Mahi-mahi, striped marlin, pink snapper (‘ōpakapaka), red snapper, wahoo (ono), swordfish, and others. It is located in the Commercial Fishing Village at Pier 38 in Honolulu, Hawaii. Like the former Tsukiji Fish Market in Japan, the auction is structured by displaying all the fish caught that day on pallets covered with ice. These are transferred to the auction floor, the tails are cut and inspectors take core samples of the interior of the fish to determine quality insuring that every fish can be inspected by buyers before making their bids.

The fishing boats begin lining up at 1:00 am to unload their catch; the auction then begins at 5:30 am on the acre-sized auction floor which is "three-quarters the size of a football field". Nearly 20% of the certified-sustainable fish is exported to the U.S. Mainland.

== See also ==
- Tamashiro Market
