= California roll =

Type of sushi roll

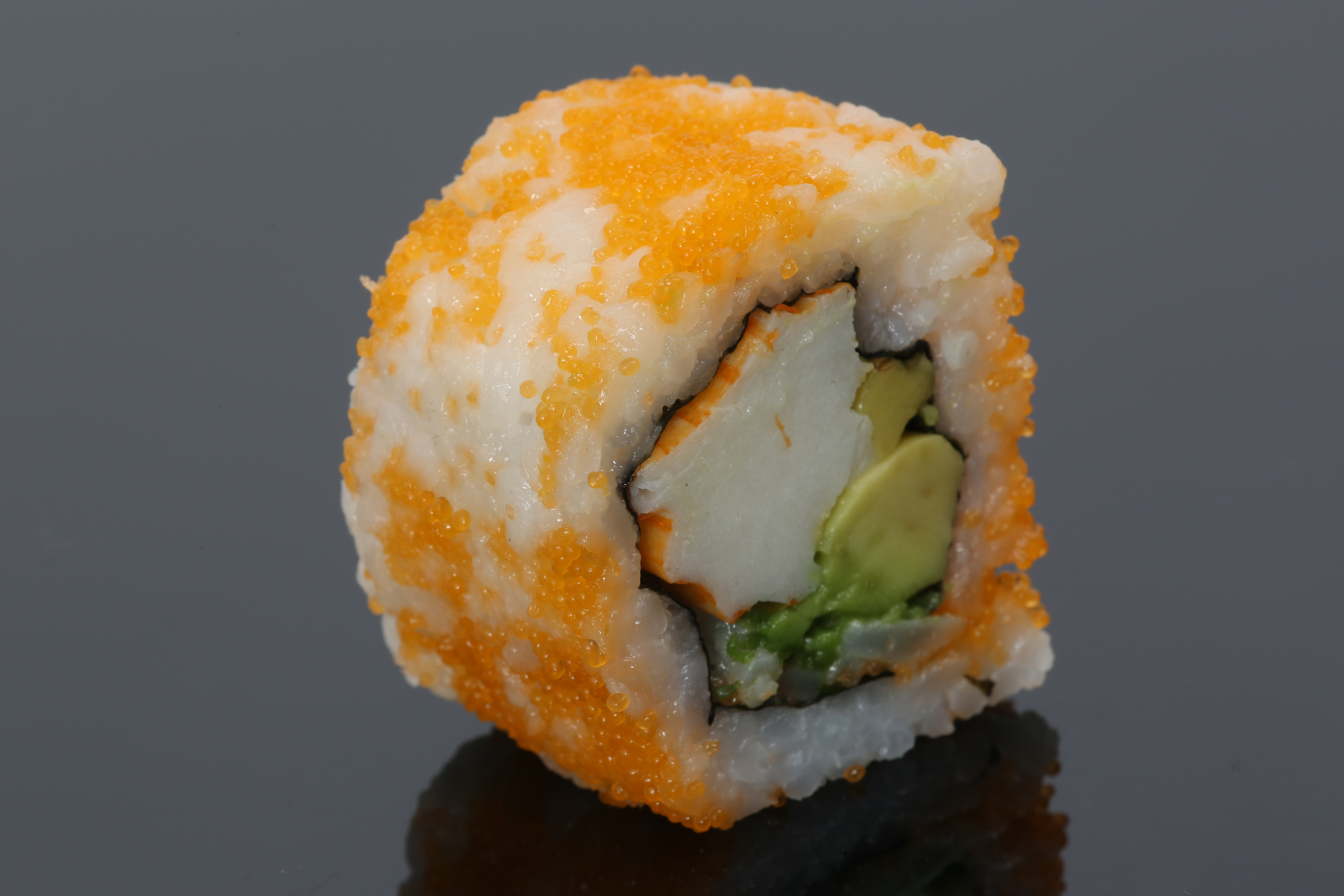
- California roll sushi with imitation crab, avocado, and tobiko roe
- Alternative names: California maki
- Course: Main course
- Place of origin: United States, Canada
- Region or state: North America
- Main ingredients: Rice, cucumber, crab meat or imitation crab, avocado, nori
- Food energy (per serving): 1 serving (2 pieces), 540 kJ (129 kcal)

California roll (Japanese: カリフォルニアロール, Hepburn: Kariforunia rōru), or California maki (加州巻き, Kashū maki; "maki" means "rolled" in Japanese) is a type of sushi that contains imitation crab (or, rarely, real crab), avocado, and cucumber. Sometimes crab salad is substituted for the crab stick. In America it comes as uramaki (inside-out makizushi roll) and often the outer layer of rice is sprinkled with toasted sesame seeds or roe (such as tobiko from flying fish). Outside America, California rolls may be closer to the traditional design or futomaki, with nori seaweed on the outside.

As one of the most popular styles of sushi in the United States, Canada and Australia, the California roll has been influential in sushi's global popularity, and in inspiring sushi chefs around the world to create non-traditional fusion cuisine.

== Ingredients ==
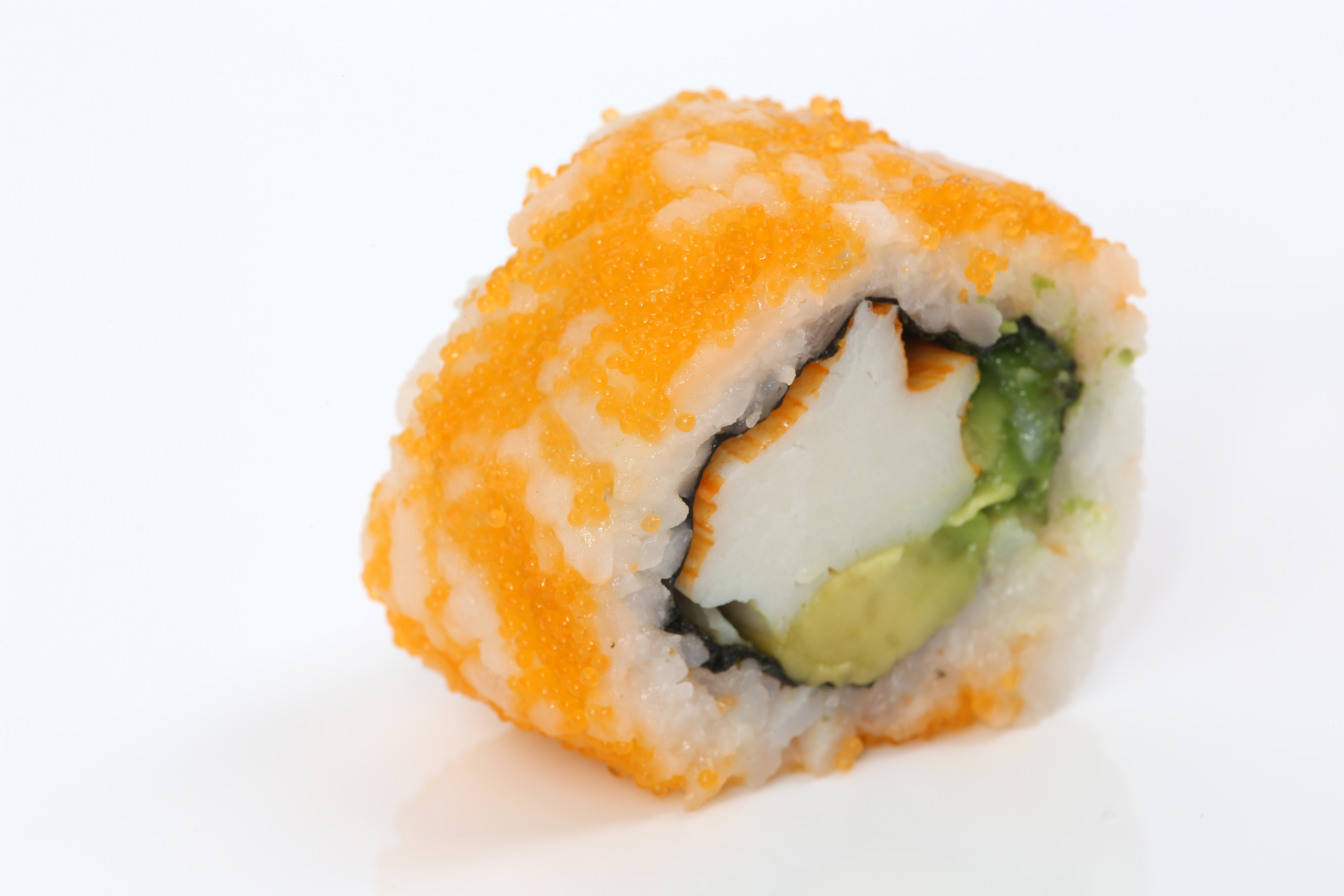

The main wrapped ingredients are the avocado and imitation crab (surimi sticks); these are all typically wrapped with seaweed, although soy paper can be used. Premium versions may use real crab, as in the original recipe. The cucumber may have been used since the beginning, or added later, depending on the account. The inside-out version may also be sprinkled on the outside with sesame seeds, although tobiko (flying fish roe), or masago (capelin roe) may be used.

== History ==
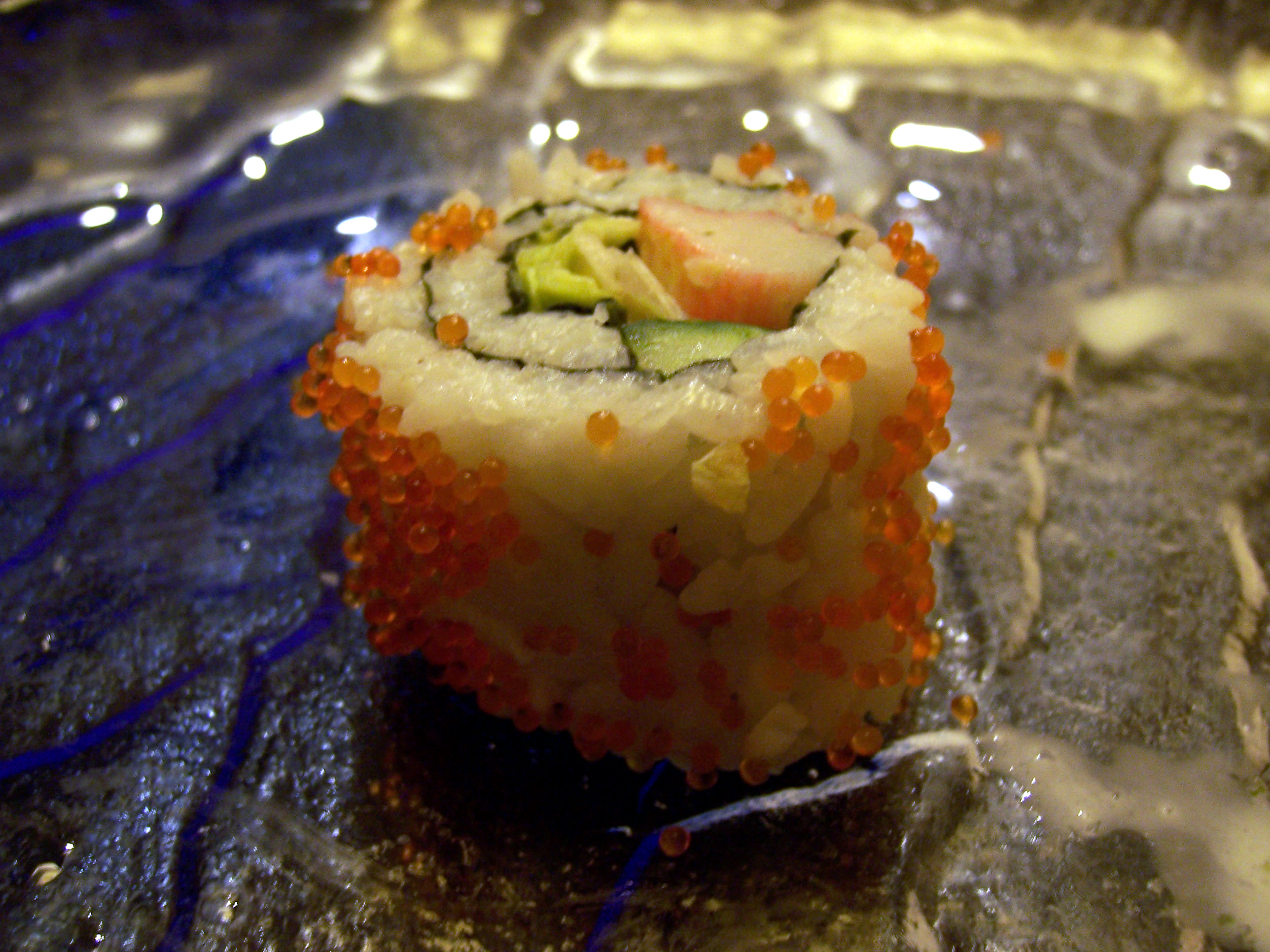

The identity of the creator of the California roll is disputed. Several chefs from Los Angeles have been cited as the dish's originator, as well as one chef from Vancouver, British Columbia.

The earliest mention in print of a "California roll" was in the Los Angeles Times and an Ocala, Florida newspaper on November 25, 1979. Less than a month later an Associated Press story credited a Los Angeles chef named Ken Seusa at the Kin Jo sushi restaurant near Hollywood as its inventor. The AP article cited Mrs. Fuji Wade, manager of the restaurant, as its source for the claim. The food writer Andrew F. Smith observes that this claim stood uncontested for more than 20 years.

Others attribute the dish to Ichiro Mashita, another Los Angeles sushi chef from the former Little Tokyo restaurant "Tokyo Kaikan". However, according to the same source, an alternative account attributes the roll’s development to efforts to appeal to non-Japanese customers, including suggestions from the Tokyo Kaikan's owner Daikichiro Kodaka. The inside-out style, with the seaweed on the inside, is said to have been devised by the restaurant’s chefs after noticing that American customers found seaweed unappealing and would remove it before eating. According to this account, Mashita began substituting the toro (fatty tuna) with avocado in the off-season, and after further experimentation, developed the prototype, back in the 1960s (or early 1970s).

Accounts of these first "California Rolls" describe a dish very different from the one today. Early California roll recipes used frozen king crab legs, since surimi imitation crab was not yet available locally and importing it was not convenient. One story, drawn directly from a firsthand source (namely Teruo Imaizumi, Mashita's assistant), was that in 1964, the pair developed a prototype which used cubed avocado, king crab, cucumber and ginger, made into a hand-roll (rather than makizushi rolled using a makisu). (Note: In Imaizumi's account, as reported by Kamp, the roll was developed with the intent to placate the immigrant Japanese clientele during tuna's off-season and only later caught on with Caucasian clients too squeamish to eat raw fish on the first try. That native Japanese were the initial target is also reinforced by Corson's writings. However, Issenberg writes that the American diners (i.e. Caucasians) were already toro connoisseurs, and that it was instead their appetites that needed to be satiated during the off-season. Issenberg also discounts the "myth" that prompting by an executive of the restaurant's proprietorship, EIWA, was instrumental in the invention,. Calling it a "narrative of institutional ingenuity", Issenberg states this was an attempt for the managerial higher echelons to assert partial credit for an innovation brought about by their lower ranking employees.) Other food writers state that the cucumber, mayonnaise, and sesame seed were originally missing, and these ingredients were only added later. The early California roll was wrapped traditional style, with the nori seaweed on the outside, which American customers tended to peel off. Therefore, the roll "inside-out", i.e., uramaki version was eventually developed. This adaptation has also been credited to Mashita by figures associated with the restaurant, including Noritoshi Kanai of Mutual Trading Co., Inc., a major importer and distributor based in Southern California that supplied the restaurant. (Note: In Issenberg 2007 and other references, the chief eyewitness source for the California roll story is Noritoshi Kanai of Mutual Trading, an importer that was the supplier to the restaurant. In the San Diego Union piece, it is his daughter Atsuko Kanai, vice president of Mutual Trading, who credits Mashita with making the roll "inside-out".)

Japanese-born chef Hidekazu Tojo, a resident of Vancouver since 1971, claimed he created the California roll at his restaurant in the late 1970s. Tojo insists he is the innovator of the "inside-out" sushi, and it got the name "California roll" because its contents of crab and avocado were abbreviated to C.A., which is the abbreviation for the state of California. Because of this coincidence, Tojo was set on the name California Roll. According to Tojo, he single-handedly created the California roll at his Vancouver restaurant, including all the modern ingredients of cucumber, cooked crab, and avocado. However, this conflicts with many food historians' accounts, which describe a changing, evolving dish that emerged in the Los Angeles area. In 2016 the Japanese Ministry of Agriculture, Forestry and Fisheries named Tojo a goodwill ambassador for Japanese cuisine.

Regardless of who invented it, after becoming a favorite in southern California the dish became popular all across the United States by the 1980s. The California roll was featured by Gourmet magazine in 1980, and taken up by a restaurant critic for The New York Times the following year. The roll contributed to sushi's growing popularity in the United States by easing diners into more exotic sushi options. Sushi chefs have since devised many kinds of rolls, beyond simple variations of the California roll.

It also made its way to Japan ("reverse imported"), where it is often called California maki or Kashū Maki (加州巻き).

== See also ==
- American cuisine – Food culture of the United States
- Canadian cuisine – Culinary traditions of Canada
- Fusion cuisine – Food combining multiple culinary traditions
- North American cuisine – Foods native to or popular in countries of North America
