= Rainbow roll =

Uramaki sushi roll filled with cucumber, avocado and crab stick

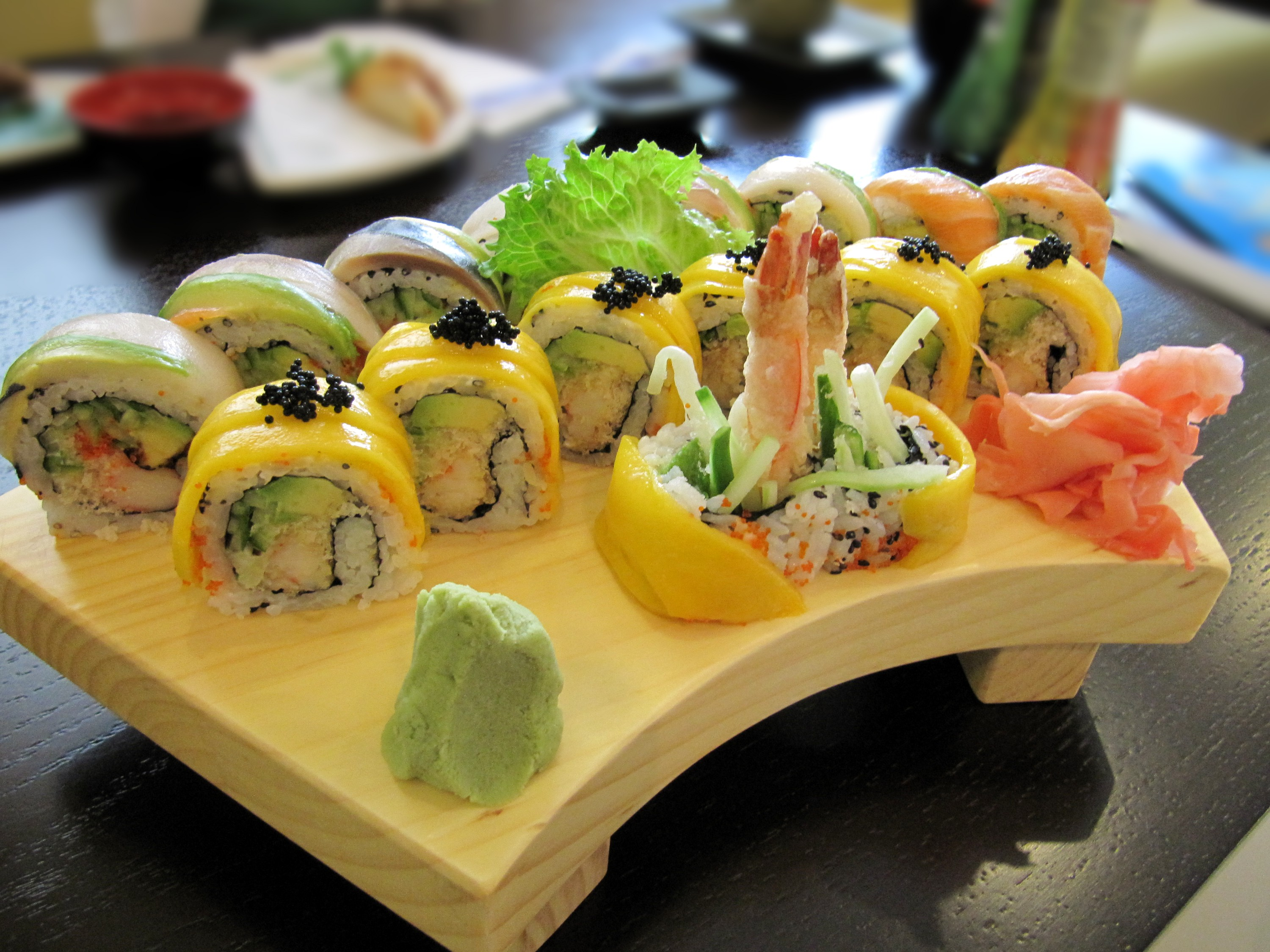
Rainbow roll, uramaki sushi with multiple fillings and toppings; including shrimp tempura, salmon, white fish, avocado, mango, with rice mixed with tobiko

Rainbow roll is a type of uramaki sushi roll filled with cucumber, avocado and crab stick. It is prepared with multiple types of fish, most commonly tuna, salmon, white fish, yellowtail, snapper, and eel. Rainbow roll is quite similar to the California roll, with the addition of tuna, salmon and avocado. Other variants include slices of mango next to avocado, or uses of imitation crab meat, fried shrimp tempura, and other seafood.

The name of the roll refers to the colourful pattern of raw fish and fruits across its top that resembles a rainbow.

It is also known as Geisha roll, dragon roll, or fish roll.

== History ==
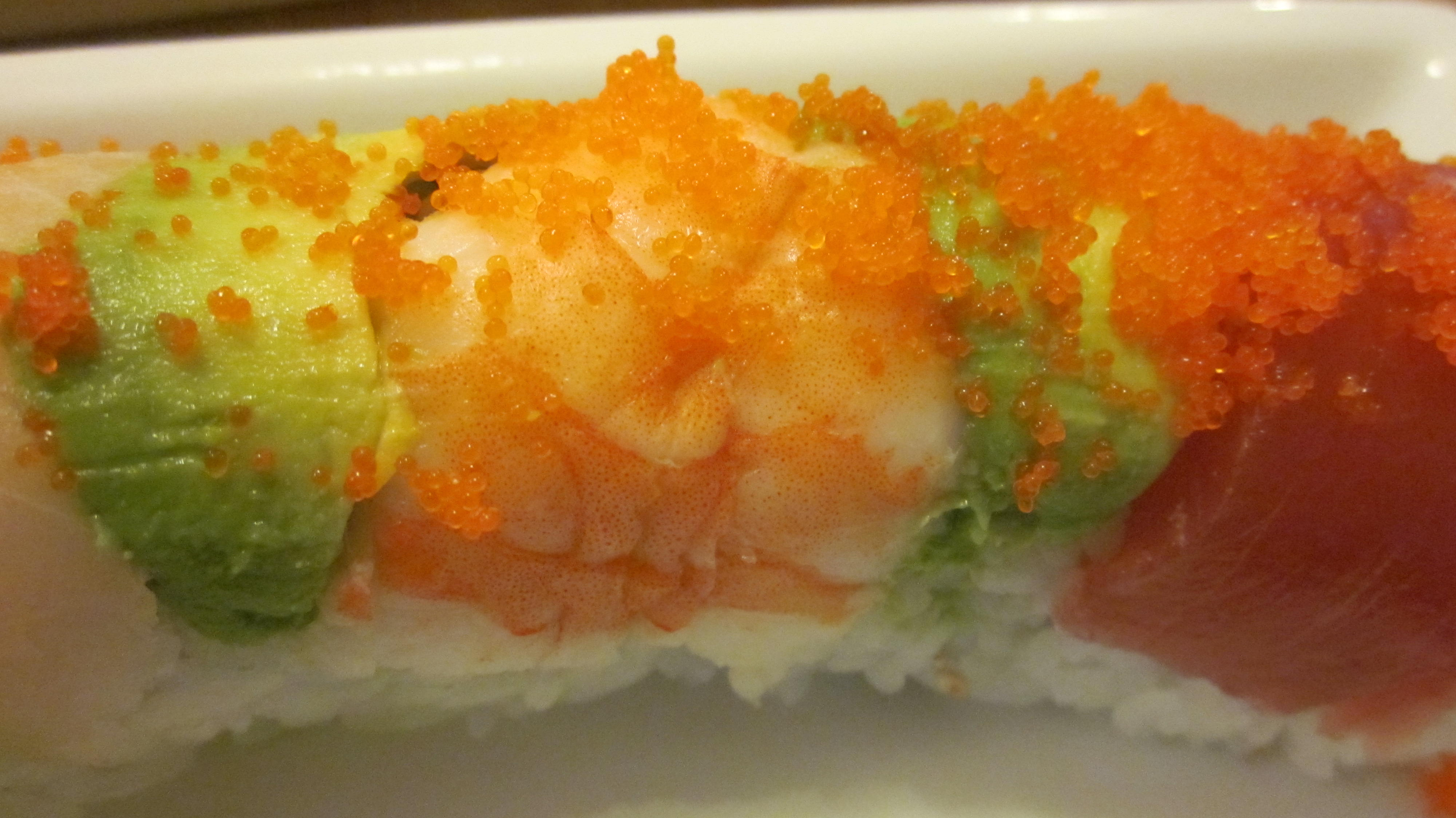
Colourful rainbow roll

The rainbow roll was introduced into United States culinary culture after the California roll, the first roll with nori seaweed leaf hidden inside rice. While the California roll uses no raw fish at all, the rainbow roll takes it one step further by adding raw tuna, salmon, shrimp, and white fish.
