= Avocado oil =

Edible oil pressed from the pulp of avocados

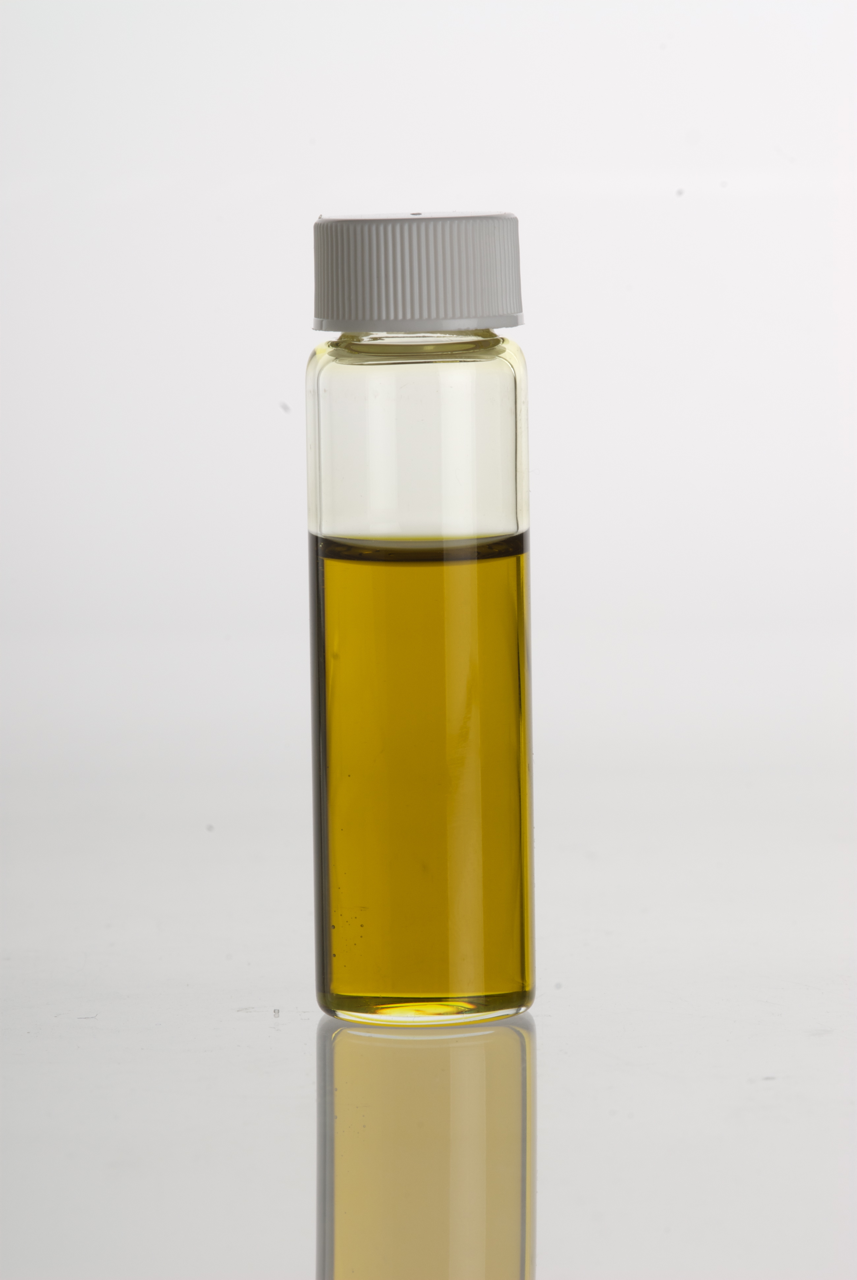
Avocado oil

Avocado oil is an edible oil extracted from the pulp of avocados, the fruit of Persea americana. It is used as an edible oil both raw and for cooking, where it is noted for its high smoke point. It is also used for lubrication and in cosmetics.

Avocado oil has an exceptionally high smoke point: 250 °C (482 °F) for unrefined oil and 271 °C (520 °F) for refined. The exact smoke point depends on the amount of refinement and the way the oil is stored.

== Uses ==
Avocado oil functions well as a carrier oil for other flavors. It is high in monounsaturated fats and vitamin E, and also enhances the absorption of carotenoids and other nutrients.

Following drying of the avocado flesh to remove as much water as possible (the flesh is about 65% water), oil for cosmetics is usually extracted with solvents at elevated temperatures. After extraction, it is usually refined, bleached, and deodorized, resulting in an odorless yellow oil. Edible cold-pressed avocado oil is generally unrefined, like extra virgin olive oil, so it retains the flavor and color characteristics of the fruit flesh.

== Potential adulteration ==
A study performed at the University of California, Davis in 2020 determined that a majority of the domestic and imported avocado oil sold in the US was rancid before its expiration date or was adulterated with other oils. In some cases, the researchers found that bottles labeled as "pure" or "extra virgin" avocado oil contained nearly 100% soybean oil.

== Properties ==
Avocado oil is not derived from avocado seeds; it is pressed from the fleshy pulp surrounding the avocado pit. Unrefined avocado oil from the 'Hass' cultivar has a characteristic flavor, is high in monounsaturated fatty acids, and has a high smoke point (≥250 °C or 482 °F), making it a good oil for frying. 'Hass' cold-pressed avocado oil is a brilliant emerald green when extracted; the color is attributed to high levels of chlorophylls and carotenoids; it has been described as having an avocado flavor, with grassy and butter/mushroom-like flavors. Other varieties may produce oils of slightly different flavor profile; 'Fuerte' has been described as having more mushroom and less avocado flavor.

Avocado oil has a similar monounsaturated fat profile to olive oil. Avocado oil is naturally low acidic, helping to increase smoke point. Unrefined avocado oil can be safely heated to 480 °F (249 °C). Both unrefined and refined avocado oil can safely be used for almost any high-heat cooking, including baking, stir-frying, deep-frying, searing, barbecuing, roasting, and sauteing. Like all oils, the more refined, the higher the smoke point. Each 30 mL of avocado oil contains 3.6 mg of Vitamin E and 146.1 mg of beta-sitosterol.

The following table provides information about the composition of avocado oil and how it compares with other vegetable oils.

Properties of vegetable oils The nutritional values are expressed as percent (%) by mass of total fat.
Type	Processing treatment	Saturated fatty acids	Monounsaturated fatty acids		Polyunsaturated fatty acids				Smoke point
Type	Processing treatment	Saturated fatty acids	Total	Oleic acid (ω−9)	Total	α-Linolenic acid (ω−3)	Linoleic acid (ω−6)	ω−6:3 ratio	Smoke point
Avocado		11.6	70.6	67.9	13.5	1	12.5	12.5:1	250 °C (482 °F)
Brazil nut		24.8	32.7	31.3	42.0	0.1	41.9	419:1	208 °C (406 °F)
Canola		7.4	63.3	61.8	28.1	9.1	18.6	2:1	204 °C (400 °F)
Coconut		82.5	6.3	6	1.7	0.019	1.68	88:1	175 °C (347 °F)
Corn		12.9	27.6	27.3	54.7	1	58	58:1	232 °C (450 °F)
Cottonseed		25.9	17.8	19	51.9	1	54	54:1	216 °C (420 °F)
Cottonseed	hydrogenated	93.6	1.5		0.6	0.2	0.3	1.5:1	
Flaxseed/linseed		9.0	18.4	18	67.8	53	13	0.2:1	107 °C (225 °F)
Grape seed		9.6	16.1	15.8	69.9	0.10	69.6	very high	216 °C (421 °F)
Hemp seed		7.0	9.0	9.0	82.0	22.0	54.0	2.5:1	166 °C (330 °F)
High-oleic safflower oil		7.5	75.2	75.2	12.8	0	12.8	very high	212 °C (414 °F)
Olive (extra virgin)		13.8	73.0	71.3	10.5	0.7	9.8	14:1	193 °C (380 °F)
Palm		49.3	37.0	40	9.3	0.2	9.1	45.5:1	235 °C (455 °F)
Palm	hydrogenated	88.2	5.7		0				
Peanut		16.2	57.1	55.4	19.9	0.318	19.6	61.6:1	232 °C (450 °F)
Rice bran oil		25	38.4	38.4	36.6	2.2	34.4	15.6:1	232 °C (450 °F)
Sesame		14.2	39.7	39.3	41.7	0.3	41.3	138:1	
Soybean		15.6	22.8	22.6	57.7	7	51	7.3:1	238 °C (460 °F)
Soybean	partially hydrogenated	14.9	43.0	42.5	37.6	2.6	34.9	13.4:1	
Sunflower oil		8.99	63.4	62.9	20.7	0.16	20.5	128:1	227 °C (440 °F)
Walnut oil	unrefined	9.1	22.8	22.2	63.3	10.4	52.9	5:1	160 °C (320 °F)

== See also ==
- List of avocado dishes
