= Deep-fried avocado =

Dish made with avocado

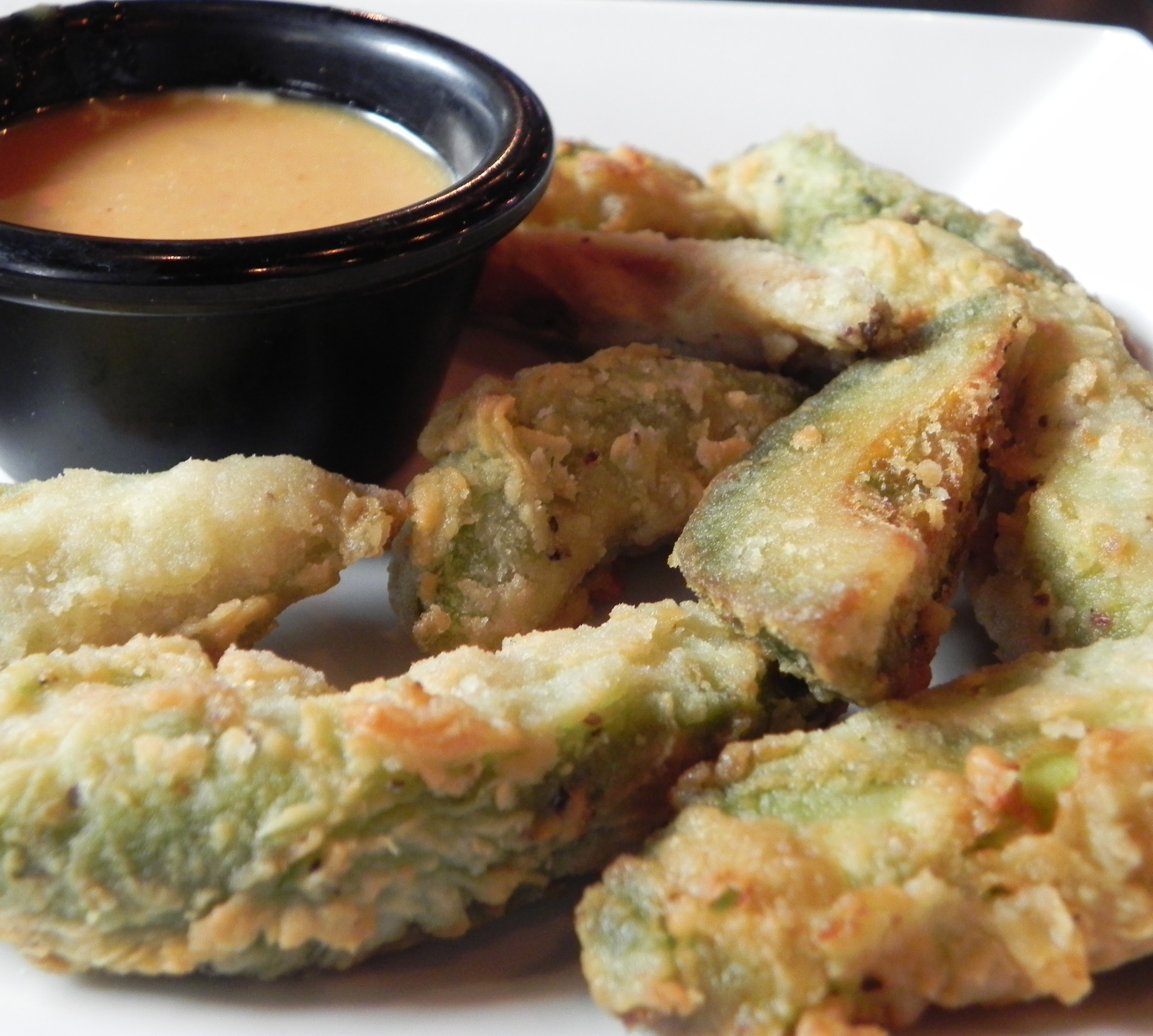
Fried avocado wedges with a dipping sauce

Deep-fried avocado is a dish prepared using avocado that has been breaded or battered and deep-fried. Panko bread crumbs are sometimes used. The dish can be stuffed with meats, cheese and other ingredients. The avocado inside the breading or batter may melt after the deep frying occurs. Deep-fried avocado with an egg placed inside the avocado is a breakfast dish. Deep-fried avocado is also used as a main ingredient in deep-fried avocado tacos, as an additional ingredient or topping in tacos, and sometimes as a hamburger topping.

== Avocado fries ==
Avocado fries is a type of fries dish prepared using avocado instead of potatoes. The avocado is typically sliced into strips, breaded or battered, and then deep-fried. The breading or batter may be seasoned, and salt can be sprinkled atop the dish after deep-frying occurs. It is sometimes served as an appetizer or starter dish, and may be accompanied with a dipping sauce. Avocado fries can also be cooked by baking. Avocado fries have fewer carbohydrates compared to fries prepared using potatoes.

== Commercial preparations ==
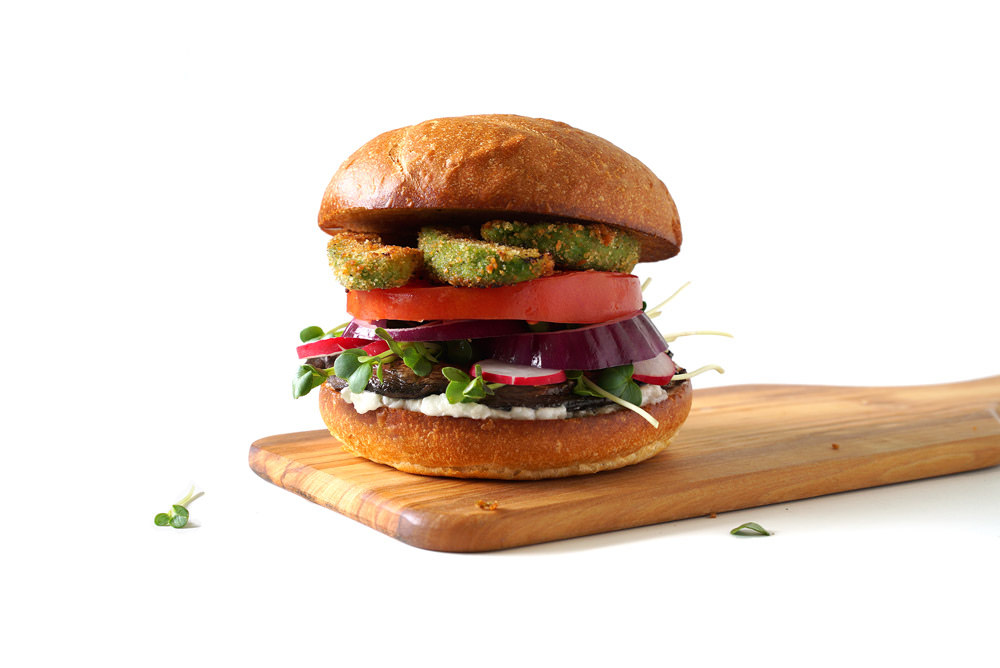
A veggie burger with deep-fried avocado (below the top bun)

Deep-fried avocados are often found at festivals and state fairs such as the Iowa State Fair or the California Avocado Festival. In 2011, attendees at the Orange County Fair in Costa Mesa, California, consumed 10,000 slices of deep-fried avocado.

The Cheesecake Factory, a restaurant chain in the United States, has offered a deep-fried avocado egg roll dish.

Avocado fries debuted at Boston's Fenway Park in 2023.

== See also ==
- List of avocado dishes
- List of deep fried foods
- List of hors d'oeuvre
