= Philadelphia roll =

Type of sushi

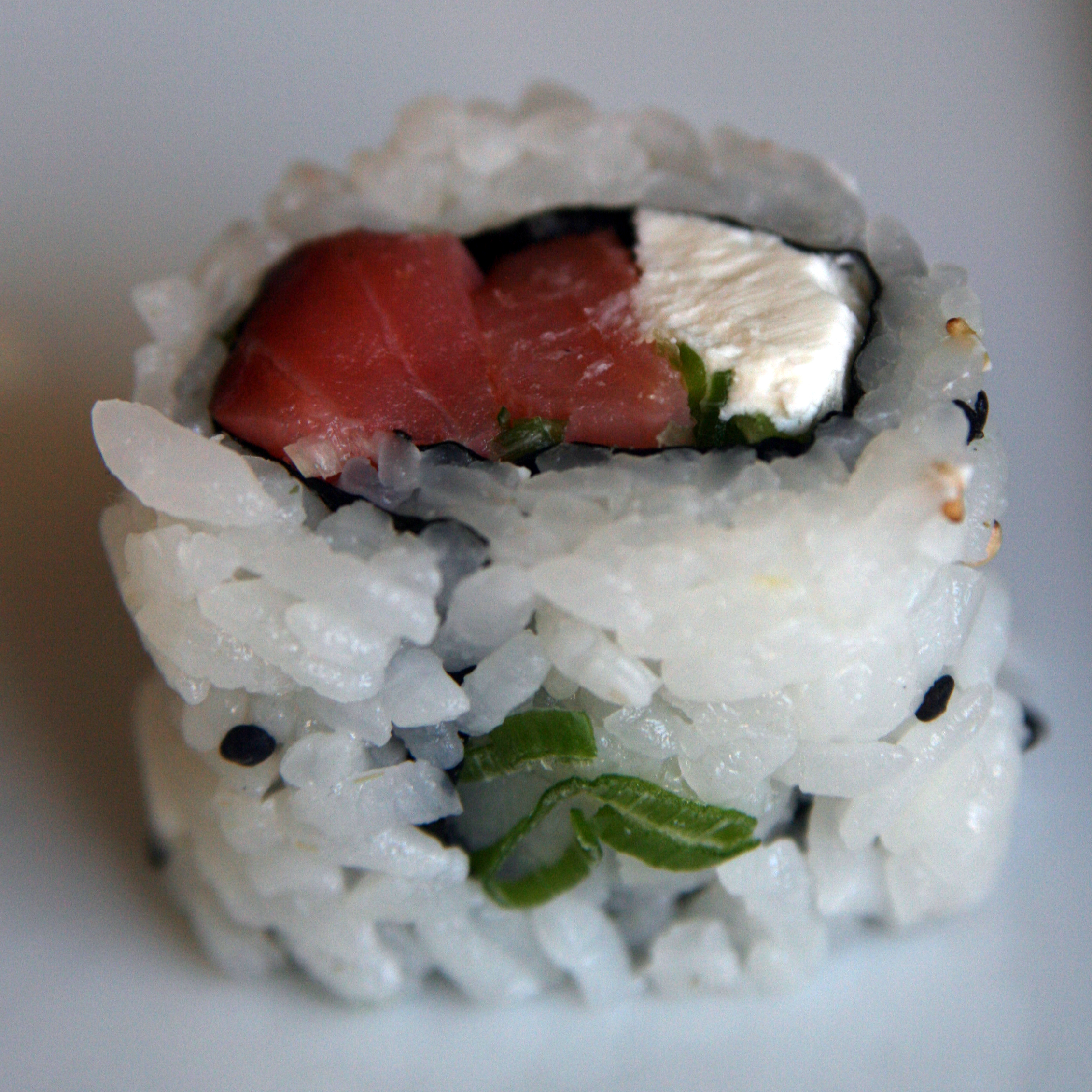
A Philadelphia roll with less commonly used raw salmon and cream cheese. Originally, the roll used smoked salmon.

A Philadelphia roll is a makizushi (also classified as a kawarizushi) type of sushi generally made with smoked (or sometimes raw) salmon, cream cheese, and cucumber, with the rice on the outside (uramaki). It is sometimes made with imitation crab instead of salmon, but can be found to include other ingredients, such as other types of fish, cucumber, scallions, and sesame seed. Like many Western-inspired sushi rolls, its design and name are modified to target an American market, which includes putting the rice on the outside, and the nori in the inside (inside-out sushi) to appeal to western aesthetics.

In the Pacific Northwest, the Philadelphia roll is often called a Seattle roll.
