= Noritoshi Kanai =

- Born: February 25, 1923. Ochiai Village, Toyotama County, Tokyo
- Died: April 22, 2017 (aged 94)
- Occupation: Executive
- Known for: Credited with the idea of opening the first authentic sushi bar in the United States

Noritoshi Kanai (金井紀年, カナイ・ノリトシ) (February 25, 1923 – April 22, 2017) was a Japanese-born executive of the Los Angeles branch of the food importer, Mutual Trading Company. He has been credited with the idea of opening the first authentic sushi bar in the United States during the 1960s.

== Life and work ==
Kanai was born February 25, 1923, in Ochiai Village, Toyotama County, Tokyo. He graduated from the Tokyo College of Commerce (today's Hitotsubashi University).

In 1951, Kanai joined Tokyo Mutual Trading Co., an affiliate to Mutual Trading Co., Inc., a Los Angeles-based company started by Sadagoro Hoshizaki, a merchant in Little Tokyo in 1926. This was a company to bring in Japanese foodstuff as a co-op operation from Japan.

In 1964, Kanai permanently relocated to Los Angeles with his family to manage Mutual Trading Co., Inc. Kanai is credited with promoting the idea of opening a sushi counter on the premises of the Kawafuku restaurant in Little Tokyo, Los Angeles. This restaurant is said to be the first authentic "sushi bar" in the United States, with a trained sushi chef from Japan. Some sources agree that Kawafuku was the first American sushi bar, but merely acknowledge Mutual Trading as being the purveyor of sushi ingredients to the restaurant.

Kanai was decorated with the Order of the Rising Sun, Gold Rays with Rosette (kyokujitsu shōjushō) in Autumn 2009, recognized for his contributions in establishing the overseas voting system (在外投票, zaigai tōhyō) for Japanese living outside their country, and for promoting Japanese food culture in the United States.

Noritoshi Kanai died at aged 94 on April 22, 2017.
