= Mutual Trading Co., Inc =

Japanese-American food service business

Mutual Trading Company, Inc
- Founded: 1926; 100 years ago in Little Tokyo, Los Angeles, United States
- Headquarters: El Monte, California, United States
- Key people: Noritoshi Kanai
- Website: www.mutual.us

Mutual Trading Company, Inc. (MTC) is a Japanese-American food service distributor. It is a major importer, manufacturer, and distributor of Japanese food products, beverages, and restaurant supplies in the United States. Founded in 1926 by Sadagoro Hoshizaki, the company is one of the oldest and largest Japanese food distribution companies operating in the United States.

Since its founding, the company has played a historical role in shaping Japanese food culture in the United States and supplying Japanese American communities, restaurants, and retailers with essential food products and cookware. Its fourth president, Noritoshi Kanai, has been widely credited with popularizing Edomae sushi in the United States, helping open the first authentic sushi bar in the country in the 1960s. In 1970, Mutual Trading became the first company in the world to import frozen edamame.

In addition to its main importing, manufacturing, and distribution business, the company also operates the Sake School of America and the Miyako Sushi and Washoku School. Since 1989, the company has hosted the Japanese Food & Restaurant Expo in the U.S. annually, enabling suppliers to meet with restaurant owners and experts.

== History ==
MTC was founded in 1926, by merchant Sadagoro Hoshizaki as a cooperative enterprise to import and distribute Japanese food staples for Japanese-American immigrants in Little Tokyo.

During World War II, the company briefly closed its doors after President Franklin D. Roosevelt issued Executive Order 9066, forcing Japanese-American business owners in Little Tokyo to close their businesses to report to internment camps. The company stored its inventory in the basement of Maryknoll Catholic School through the duration of the war. After the war, the company retrieved its inventory and resumed operations, supplying food and restaurant goods to families and businesses rebuilding in Los Angeles’s Little Tokyo and surrounding areas.

Hoshizaki served as the company’s founding president following its establishment in 1926 and through the war. Leadership later passed to Chuhei Ishii and Richard Akira Inaba. Noritoshi Kanai, who joined the company in 1951, later served as its fourth president in 1964 and is widely credited with helping open the first authentic sushi bar in the country, coining the term "sushi bar" and introducing Edomae sushi to the United States.

In 2016, Takara Shuzo International, a subsidiary of Takara Holdings Inc., increased its ownership stake in Mutual Trading to 51 percent, obtaining a controlling interest in the company.

== Operations ==
As of 2025, Mutual Trading operates across 13 sales points in the U.S.: Los Angeles, San Diego, Las Vegas, Seattle, Phoenix, Dallas, New York, Boston, Washington, D.C., Atlanta, Chicago, Miami, and Honolulu. The company also operates out of Lima, Peru and Tokyo, Japan.

Mutual Trading imports, manufactures, and distributes over 10,000 products as of 2025, including Japanese food products; sake, shochu, and other alcoholic beverages; frozen and refrigerated foods; tableware, cookware, and restaurant supplies.

Mutual Trading also operates two educational institutions: the Miyako Sushi & Washoku School and the Sake School of America..
