= Tobiko =

Flying fish roe

Tobiko (とびこ) is flying fish roe in Japanese cuisine, known for its use in sushi.

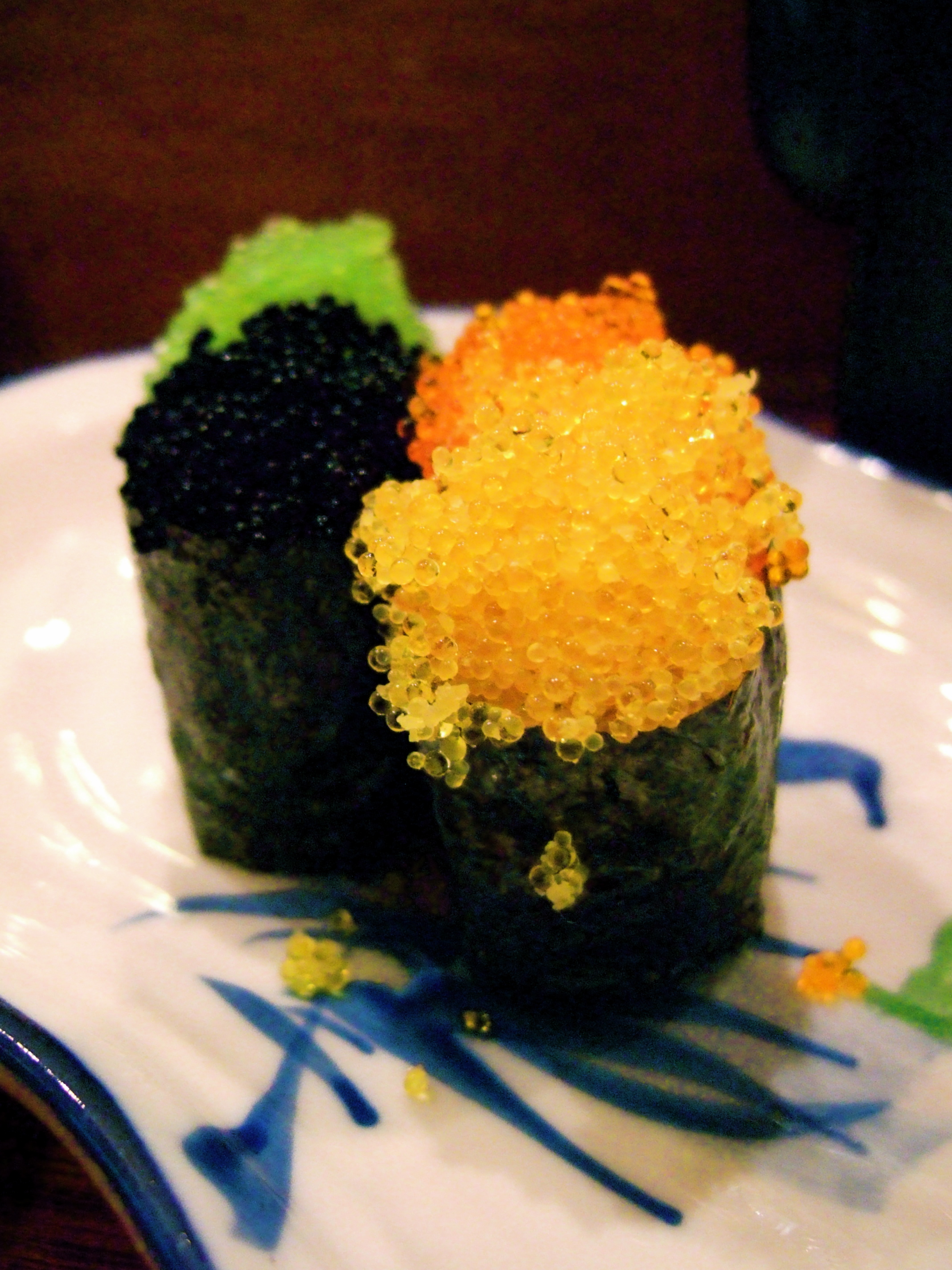
Tobiko in varying colors, served as sushi

== Description ==
The eggs are small, ranging from 0.5 to 0.8 mm. For comparison, tobiko is larger than masago (capelin roe), but smaller than ikura (salmon roe). Natural tobiko has a red-orange color, a mild smoky or salty taste, and a crunchy texture.

Tobiko is sometimes colored to change its appearance: other natural ingredients are used to accomplish the change, such as squid ink to make it black, yuzu to make it pale orange (almost yellow), or even wasabi to make it green and spicy. A serving of tobiko can contain several pieces, each having a different color.

When prepared as sashimi, it may be presented on avocado halves or wedges. Tobiko is used in the creation of many other Japanese dishes. Often, it is used as an ingredient in California rolls.

Frequently, masago (capelin or smelt roe) is substituted for tobiko, due to its similar appearance and flavor. Tobiko is also sometimes "adulterated" with dyed herring eggs.

== Nutrition ==
The raw roe is very nutritious, due to its high vitamin content, high protein content, and large ratio of omega-3 to omega-6 fatty acids.

== Gallery ==
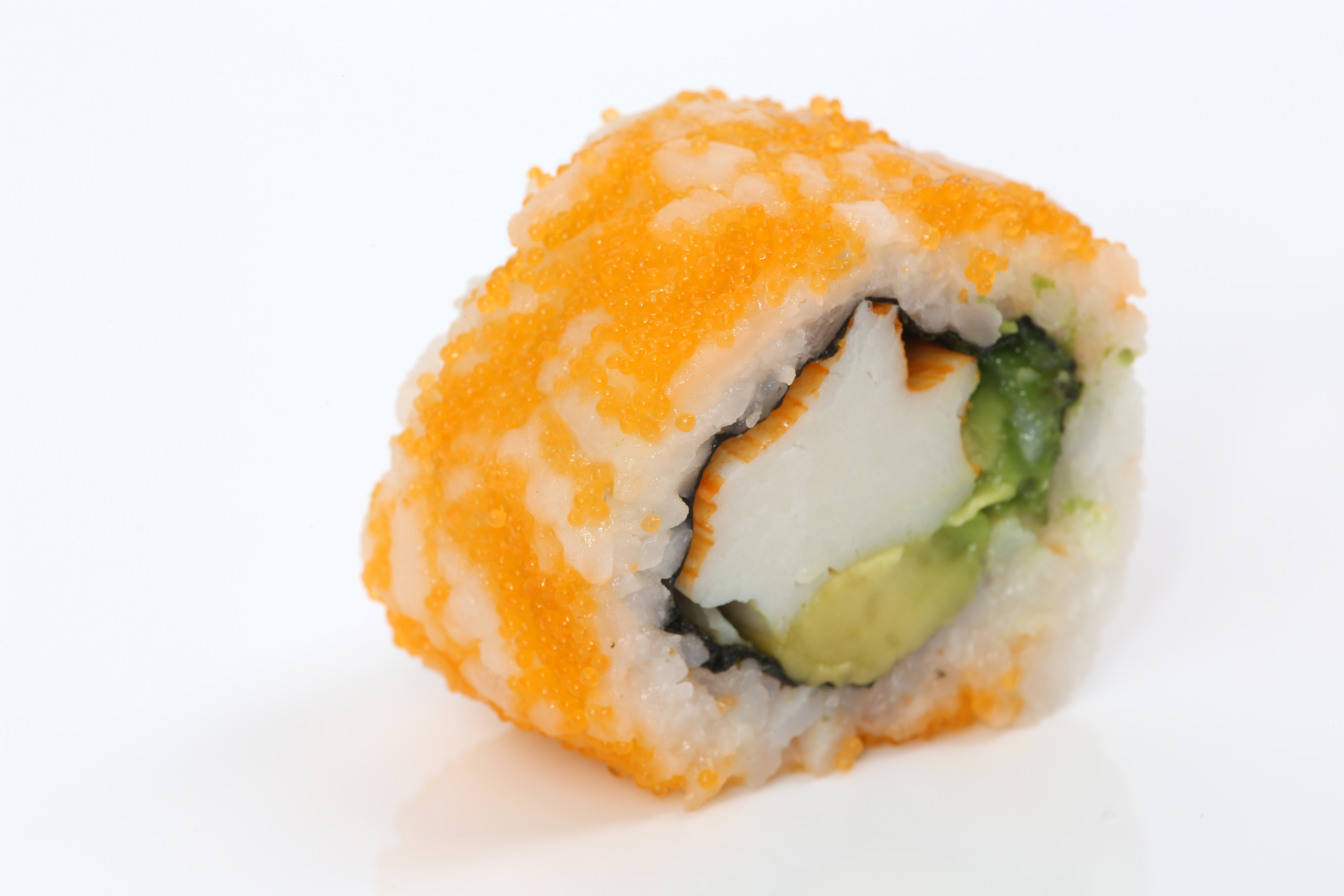
California roll covered in tobiko

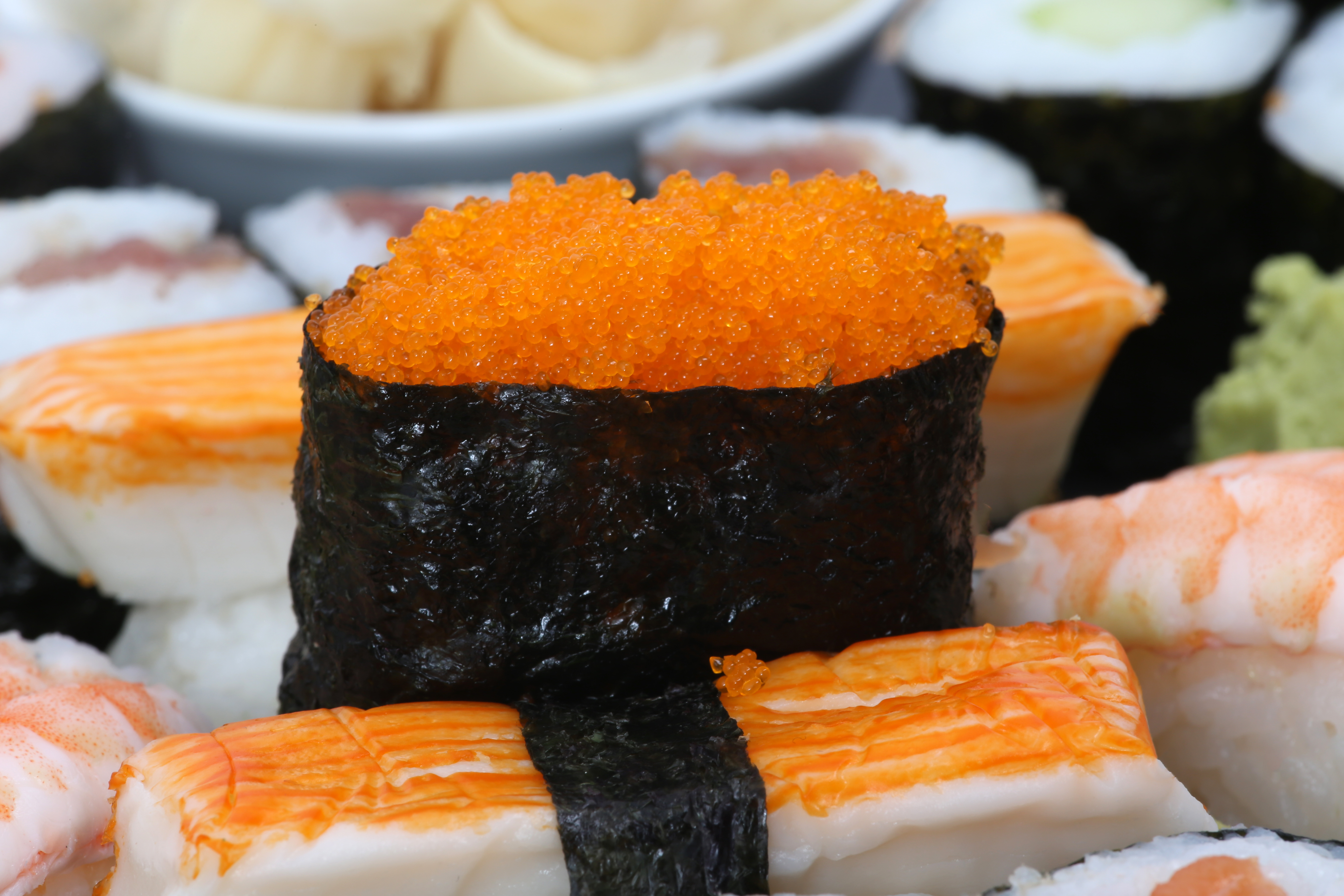

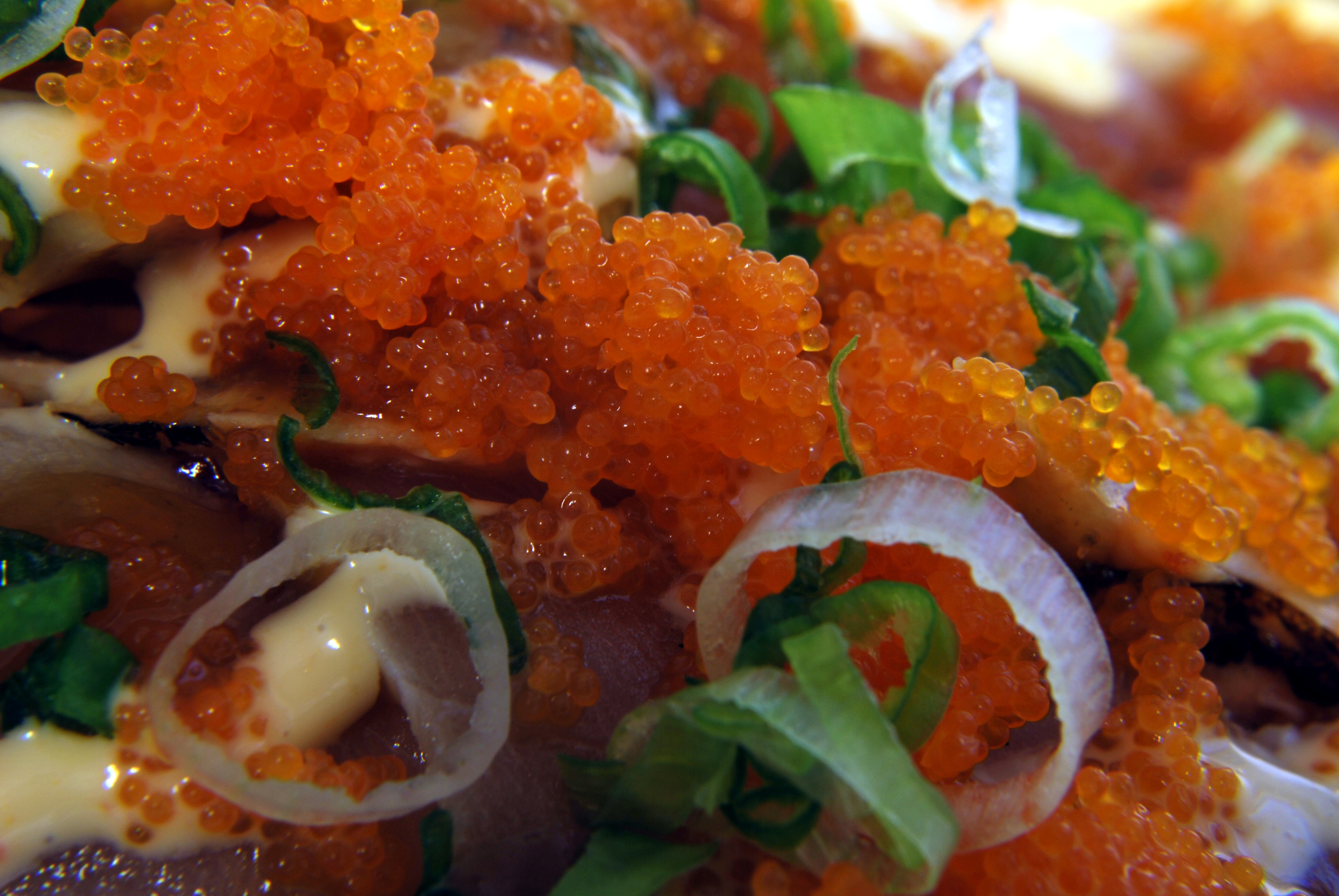
Tobiko, shown in its natural color, topping grilled albacore tuna
