= List of Centris species =

This is a list of 215 species in the genus Centris, centris bees.

== Centris species ==
- Centris adani Cockerell, 1949^{i c g}
- Centris adunca Moure, 2003^{i c g}
- Centris aenea Lepeletier, 1841^{i c g}
- Centris aeneiventris Mocsáry, 1899^{i c g}
- Centris aethiocesta Snelling, 1984^{i c g}
- Centris aethiops Cresson, 1865^{i c g}
- Centris aethyctera Snelling, 1974^{i c g}
- Centris agameta Snelling, 1974^{i c g}
- Centris agilis Smith, 1874^{i c g}
- Centris agiloides Snelling, 1984^{i c g}
- Centris albiceps Friese, 1899^{i c g}
- Centris americana (Klug, 1810)^{i c g}
- Centris amica Moure, 1960^{i c g}
- Centris analis (Fabricius, 1804)^{i c g}
- Centris ancashsumaq ^{g}
- Centris angustifrons Snelling, 1966^{i c g}
- Centris anomala Snelling, 1966^{i c g}
- Centris aterrima Smith, 1854^{i c g}
- Centris atra Friese, 1900^{i c g}
- Centris atripes Mocsáry, 1899^{i c g b}
- Centris barbadensis Cockerell, 1939^{i c g}
- Centris bicolor Lepeletier, 1841^{i c g}
- Centris bicornuta Mocsáry, 1899^{i c g}
- Centris bitaeniata Moure, 2002^{i c g}
- Centris boliviensis Mocsáry, 1899^{i c g}
- Centris braccata Packard, 1869^{i c g}
- Centris brethesi Schrottky, 1902^{i c g}
- Centris buchholzi Herbst, 1918^{i c g}
- Centris burgdorfi Friese, 1900^{i c g}
- Centris caelebs Friese, 1900^{i c g}
- Centris caesalpiniae Cockerell, 1897^{i c g b}
- Centris californica Timberlake, 1940^{i c g}
- Centris carolae Snelling, 1966^{i c g}
- Centris carrikeri Cockerell, 1919^{i c g}
- Centris catsal Roig-Alsina, 2000^{i c g}
- Centris caxiensis Ducke, 1907^{i c g}
- Centris chilensis (Spinola, 1851)^{i c}
- Centris chlorura Cockerell, 1919^{i c g}
- Centris chrysitis Lepeletier, 1841^{i c g}
- Centris cineraria Smith, 1854^{i c g}
- Centris clypeata Lepeletier, 1841^{i c g}
- Centris cockerelli Fox, 1899^{i c g b}
- Centris collaris Lepeletier, 1841^{i c g}
- Centris confusa Moure, 1960^{i c g}
- Centris conspersa Mocsáry, 1899^{i c g}
- Centris cordillerana Roig-Alsina, 2000^{i c g}
- Centris cornuta Cresson, 1865^{i c g}
- Centris crassipes Smith, 1874^{i c g}
- Centris danunciae Moure, 2002^{i c g}
- Centris decipiens Moure & Seabra, 1960^{i c g}
- Centris decolorata Lepeletier, 1841^{i c g}
- Centris decorata Smith, 1854^{i c g}
- Centris deiopeia Gribodo, 1891^{i c g}
- Centris dentata Smith, 1854^{i c g}
- Centris denudans Lepeletier, 1841^{i c g}
- Centris denudens Lepeletier, 1841^{g}
- Centris derasa Lepeletier, 1841^{i c g}
- Centris dichrootricha (Moure, 1945)^{i c g}
- Centris difformis Smith, 1854^{i c g}
- Centris dimidiata (Olivier, 1789)^{i c g}
- Centris dirrhoda Moure, 1960^{i c g}
- Centris discolor Smith, 1874^{i c g}
- Centris dixanthozona Moure & Seabra, 1962^{i c g}
- Centris dorsata Lepeletier, 1841^{i c g}
- Centris ectypha Snelling, 1974^{i c g}
- Centris eisenii Fox, 1893^{i c g}
- Centris elegans Smith, 1874^{i c g}
- Centris ephippia Smith, 1854^{i c g}
- Centris errans Fox, 1899^{i c g b} (wandering centris)
- Centris erythrosara Moure & Seabra, 1960^{i c g}
- Centris erythrotricha Seabra & Moure, 1961^{i c g}
- Centris escomeli Cockerell, 1926^{i c g}
- Centris euphenax Cockerell, 1913^{i c g}
- Centris eurypatana Snelling, 1984^{i c g}
- Centris facialis Mocsáry, 1899^{i c g}
- Centris fasciata Smith, 1854^{i c g}
- Centris ferrisi Cockerell, 1924^{i c g}
- Centris ferruginea Lepeletier, 1841^{i c g}
- Centris festiva Smith, 1854^{i c g}
- Centris fisheri Snelling, 1974^{i c g}
- Centris flavicans Moure, 2003^{i c g}
- Centris flavifrons (Fabricius, 1775)^{i c g}
- Centris flavilabris Mocsáry, 1899^{i c g}
- Centris flavofasciata Friese, 1900^{i c g}
- Centris flavohirta Friese, 1900^{i c g}
- Centris flavopilosa Friese, 1925^{i c g}
- Centris flavothoracica Friese, 1899^{i c g}
- Centris fluviatilis Friese, 1924^{i c g}
- Centris frieseana Moure, 2003^{i c g}
- Centris fulva Friese, 1924^{i c g}
- Centris furcata Fabricius, 1804^{g}
- Centris fuscata Lepeletier, 1841^{i c g}
- Centris garleppi (Schrottky, 1913)^{i c g}
- Centris gavisa Snelling, 1988^{i c g}
- Centris gelida Snelling, 1984^{i c g}
- Centris griseola Snelling, 1984^{i c g}
- Centris haemorrhoidalis (Fabricius, 1775)^{i c g}
- Centris harbisoni Snelling, 1974^{i c g}
- Centris heithausi Snelling, 1974^{i c g}
- Centris hoffmanseggiae Cockerell, 1897^{i c g b}
- Centris horvathi Friese, 1900^{i c g}
- Centris hyptidis Ducke, 1908^{i c g}
- Centris hyptidoides Roig-Alsina, 2000^{i c g}
- Centris insignis Smith, 1854^{i c g}
- Centris insularis Smith, 1874^{i c g}
- Centris intermixta Friese, 1900^{i c g}
- Centris jujuyana Roig-Alsina, 2000^{i c g}
- Centris klugii Friese, 1900^{i c g}
- Centris labiata Friese, 1904^{i c g}
- Centris laevibullata Snelling, 1966^{i c g}
- Centris langsdorfii Blanchard, 1840^{i c g}
- Centris lanipes (Fabricius, 1775)^{i c g}
- Centris lanosa Cresson, 1872^{i c g b}
- Centris lateritia Friese, 1899^{i c g}
- Centris laticincta (Spinola, 1841)^{i c g}
- Centris leprieuri (Spinola, 1841)^{i c g}
- Centris lilacina Cockerell, 1919^{i c g}
- Centris longimana Fabricius, 1804^{i c g}
- Centris lutea Friese, 1899^{i c g}
- Centris lyngbyei Jensen-Haarup, 1908^{i c g}
- Centris machadoi Azevedo & Silveira, 2005^{i c g}
- Centris maculifrons Smith, 1854^{i c g}
- Centris maranhensis Ducke, 1911^{i c g}
- Centris mariae Mocsáry, 1896^{i c g}
- Centris maroniana Cockerell, 1917^{i c g}
- Centris meaculpa Snelling, 1984^{i c g}
- Centris melampoda Moure, 2003^{i c g}
- Centris melanochlaena Smith, 1874^{i c g}
- Centris merrillae Cockerell, 1919^{i c g}
- Centris metathoracica Friese, 1912^{i c g}
- Centris mexicana Smith, 1854^{i c g}
- Centris mixta Friese, 1904^{i c g}
- Centris mocsaryi Friese, 1899^{i c g}
- Centris moerens (Perty, 1833)^{i c g}
- Centris moldenkei Toro & Chiappa, 1989^{i c g}
- Centris mourei Roig-Alsina, 2000^{i c g}
- Centris muralis Burmeister, 1876^{i c g}
- Centris neffi Moure, 2000^{i c g}
- Centris nigerrima (Spinola, 1851)^{i c g}
- Centris nigriventris Burmeister, 1876^{i c g}
- Centris nigrocaerulea Smith, 1874^{i c g}
- Centris nigrofasciata Friese, 1899^{i c g}
- Centris nitens Lepeletier, 1841^{i c g}
- Centris nitida Smith, 1874^{i c g b}
- Centris niveofasciata Friese, 1899^{i c g}
- Centris nobilis Westwood, 1840^{i c g}
- Centris nordestina ^{g}
- Centris obscurior Michener, 1954^{i c g}
- Centris obsoleta Lepeletier, 1841^{i c g}
- Centris orellanai Ruiz, 1940^{i c g}
- Centris pachysoma Cockerell, 1919^{i c g}
- Centris pallida Fox, 1899^{i c g b} (pallid bee)
- Centris plumbea Moure, 2002^{i c g}
- Centris plumipes Smith, 1854^{i c g}
- Centris poecila Lepeletier, 1841^{i c g}
- Centris proxima Friese, 1899^{g}
- Centris pseudoephippia Friese, 1900^{i c g}
- Centris pulchra Moure, Oliveira & Viana, 2003^{i c g}
- Centris quadrimaculata Packard, 1869^{i c g}
- Centris restrepoi Moure, 2002^{i c g}
- Centris rhodadelpha Cockerell, 1939^{i c g}
- Centris rhodomelas Timberlake, 1940^{i c g}
- Centris rhodophthalma Pérez, 1911^{i c g}
- Centris rhodoprocta Moure & Seabra, 1960^{i c g}
- Centris rhodopus Cockerell, 1897^{i c g b} (red-legged centris)
- Centris rubripes Friese, 1899^{i c g}
- Centris rufipes Friese, 1899^{i c g}
- Centris rufohirta Friese, 1900^{i c g}
- Centris rufosuffusa Cockerell, 1935^{i c g}
- Centris rupestris Azevedo & Silveira, 2005^{i c g}
- Centris ruthannae Snelling, 1966^{i c g}
- Centris satana Snelling, 1984^{i c g}
- Centris scopipes Friese, 1899^{i c g}
- Centris scutellaris Friese, 1899^{i c g}
- Centris semicaerulea Smith, 1874^{i c g}
- Centris sericea Friese, 1899^{i c g}
- Centris similis (Fabricius, 1804)^{i c g}
- Centris singularis Ducke, 1904^{i c g}
- Centris smithiana Friese, 1900^{i c g}
- Centris smithii Cresson, 1879^{i c g}
- Centris spilopoda Moure, 1969^{i c g}
- Centris sponsa Smith, 1854^{i c g}
- Centris superba Ducke, 1904^{i c g}
- Centris tamarugalis Toro & Chiappa, 1989^{i c g}
- Centris tarsata Smith, 1874^{i c g}
- Centris terminata Smith, 1874^{i c g}
- Centris testacea Lepeletier, 1841^{i c g}
- Centris tetrazona Moure & Seabra, 1962^{i c g}
- Centris thelyopsis ^{g}
- Centris thoracica Lepeletier, 1841^{i c g}
- Centris tiburonensis Cockerell, 1923^{i c g}
- Centris toroi Zanella, 2002^{i c g}
- Centris torquata Moure & Seabra, 1962^{i c g}
- Centris transversa Pérez, 1905^{i c g}
- Centris tricolor Friese, 1899^{i c g}
- Centris trigonoides Lepeletier, 1841^{i c g}
- Centris unifasciata (Schrottky, 1913)^{i c g}
- Centris urens Moure, 2000^{i c g}
- Centris vallecaucensis ^{g}
- Centris vanduzeei Cockerell, 1923^{i c g}
- Centris vardyorum Roig-Alsina, 2000^{i c g}
- Centris varia (Erichson, 1848)^{i c g}
- Centris versicolor (Fabricius, 1775)^{i c g}
- Centris vidua Mocsáry, 1899^{i c g}
- Centris violacea Lepeletier, 1841^{i c g}
- Centris vittata Lepeletier, 1841^{i c g}
- Centris vogeli Roig-Alsina, 2000^{i c g}
- Centris vulpecula Burmeister, 1876^{i c g}
- Centris weilenmanni Friese, 1900^{i c g}
- Centris willineri Moure, 2000^{i c g}
- Centris xanthocnemis (Perty, 1833)^{i c g}
- Centris xanthomelaena Moure & Castro, 2001^{i c g}
- Centris xochipillii Snelling, 1984^{i c g}
- Centris zacateca Snelling, 1966^{i c g}
- Centris zonata Mocsáry, 1899^{i c g}

Data sources: i = ITIS, c = Catalogue of Life, g = GBIF, b = Bugguide.net
