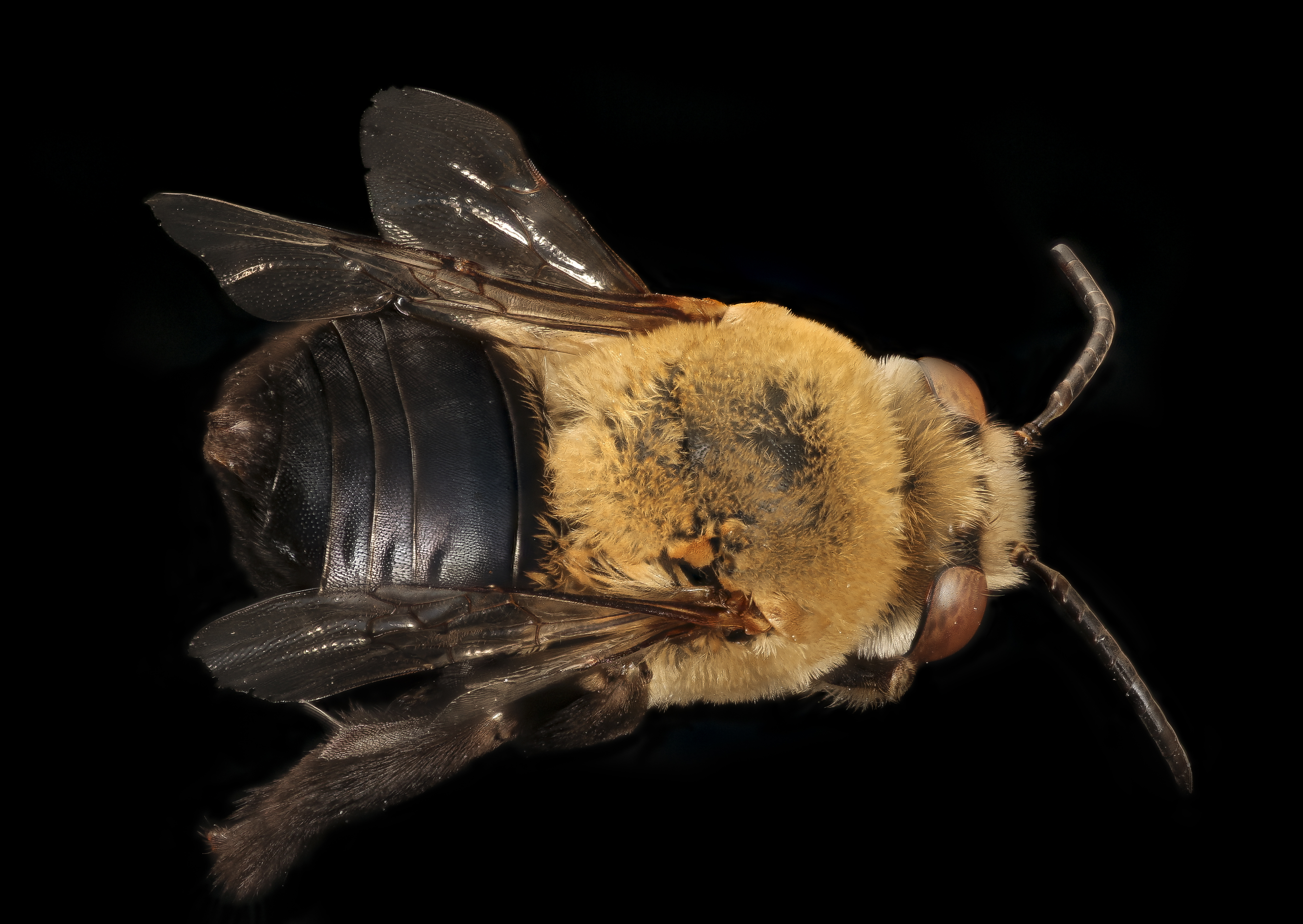

Scientific classification
- Domain: Eukaryota
- Kingdom: Animalia
- Phylum: Arthropoda
- Class: Insecta
- Order: Hymenoptera
- Family: Apidae
- Tribe: Centridini
- Genus: Centris
- Species: C. atripes

Binomial name
- Centris atripes Mocsáry, 1899

= Centris atripes =

Species of bee

Centris atripes is a species of centridine bee in the family Apidae. It is found in Central America and North America. It is a pollinator of Krameria erecta as well as Senna wislizeni of the painteri variety, which it pollinates during the rainy season.
