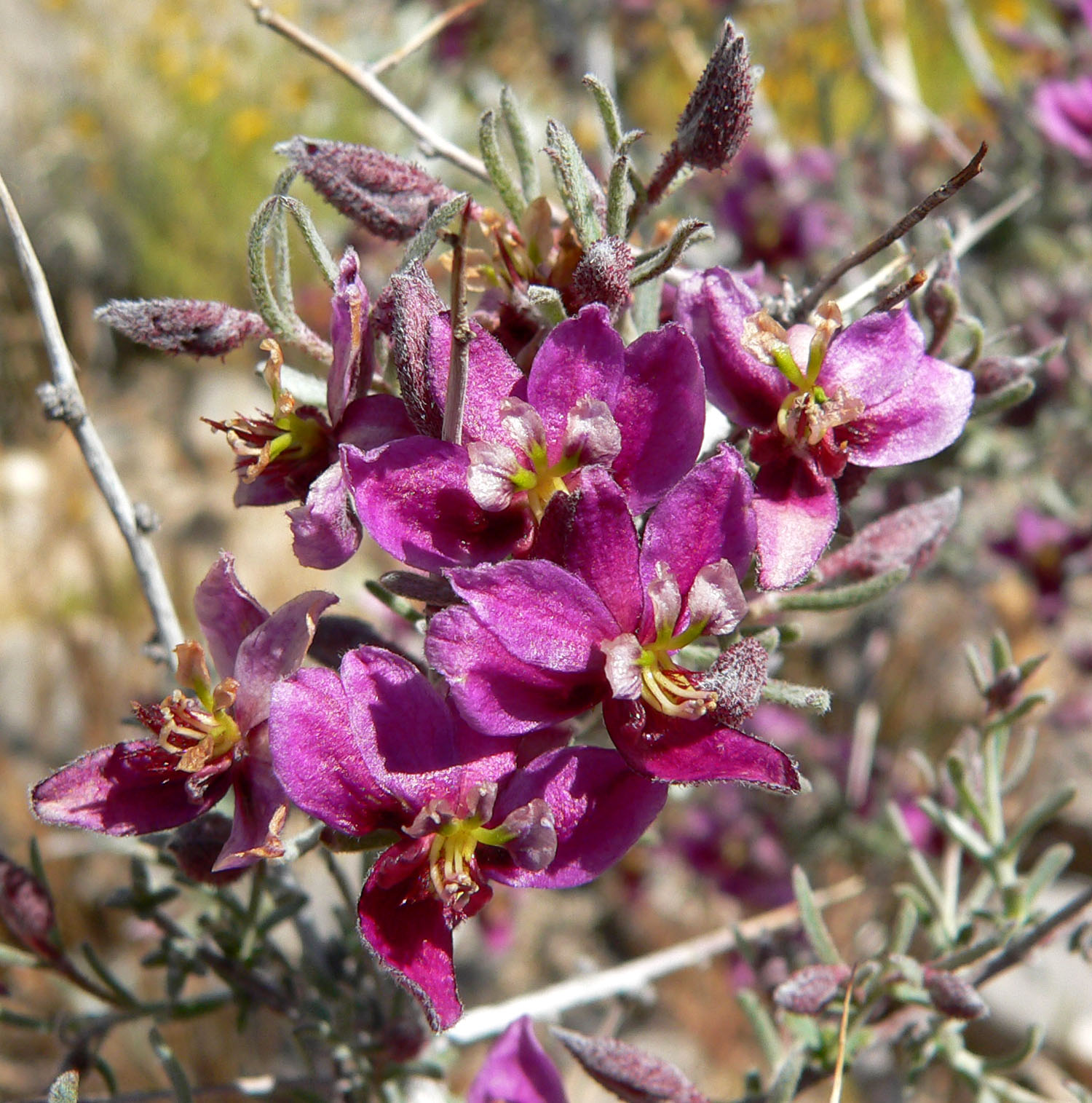

Scientific classification
- Kingdom: Plantae
- Clade: Tracheophytes
- Clade: Angiosperms
- Clade: Eudicots
- Clade: Rosids
- Order: Zygophyllales
- Family: Krameriaceae
- Genus: Krameria
- Species: K. erecta

Binomial name
- Krameria erecta Willd. ex Schult.

Synonyms
- Krameria glandulosa Rose & J.H.Painter; Krameria imparata Britton; Krameria parvifolia Benth.; Krameria interior Rose & J.H.Painter; Krameria navae Rzed.

= Krameria erecta =

Species of flowering plant

Krameria erecta is a species of rhatany known by several common names, including Pima rhatany, purple heather, and littleleaf rhatany. It is native to the southwestern United States and northern Mexico, where it grows in dry areas such as desert flats and chaparral slopes.

== Description ==
A small, tangled shrub under a meter in height with ascending branches covered in silky hairs and fuzzy linear leaves, tips of branches are not thornlike. The shrub flowers in the spring and again in the fall during wetter years. The showy flower has four or five bright pink cup-shaped sepals and usually five smaller, triangular petals which are pink with green bases. The three upper petals are held erect and the lower two are glandular structures next to the ovary. Next to these are four curving stamens. The species is pollinated by Centris atripes and Centris rhodopus bees. The fruit is a furry heart-shaped body covered in pink spines. It reproduces by seed. This species and others in its genus are root parasites, tapping the tissues of nearby plants for nutrients, especially water. This helps it survive in soil that is almost totally dry.
