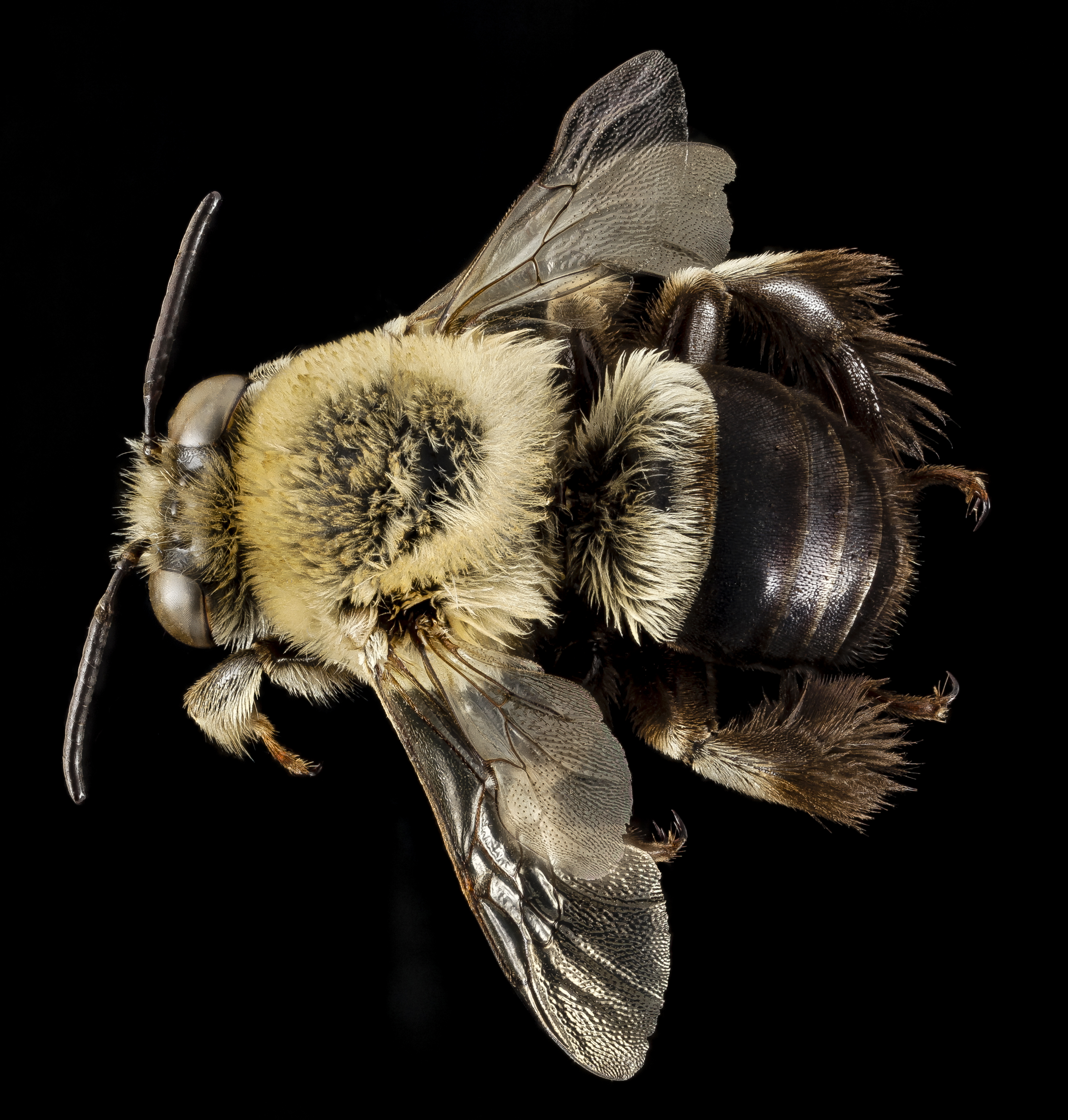

Scientific classification
- Domain: Eukaryota
- Kingdom: Animalia
- Phylum: Arthropoda
- Class: Insecta
- Order: Hymenoptera
- Family: Apidae
- Tribe: Centridini
- Genus: Centris
- Species: C. lanosa

Binomial name
- Centris lanosa Cresson, 1872

= Centris lanosa =

Species of bee

Centris lanosa is a species of centridine bee in the family Apidae. It is found in North America.
