= Centris hoffmanseggiae =

Scientific classification
- Kingdom: Animalia
- Phylum: Arthropoda
- Class: Insecta
- Order: Hymenoptera
- Family: Apidae
- Tribe: Centridini
- Genus: Centris
- Species: C. hoffmanseggiae

Binomial name
- Centris hoffmanseggiae Cockerell, 1897

Species of bee

Centris hoffmanseggiae is a species of centridine bee in the family Apidae. It is found in North America.
