= Centris caesalpiniae =

Scientific classification
- Kingdom: Animalia
- Phylum: Arthropoda
- Class: Insecta
- Order: Hymenoptera
- Family: Apidae
- Tribe: Centridini
- Genus: Centris
- Species: C. caesalpiniae

Binomial name
- Centris caesalpiniae Cockerell, 1897

Species of bee

Centris caesalpiniae is a species of centridine bee in the family Apidae. It is found in Central America and North America.

== Subspecies ==
These two subspecies belong to the species Centris caesalpiniae:

- Centris caesalpiniae caesalpiniae
- Centris caesalpiniae rhodopus Cockerell
