= Acmaeodera acanthicola =

Scientific classification
- Kingdom: Animalia
- Phylum: Arthropoda
- Clade: Pancrustacea
- Class: Insecta
- Order: Coleoptera
- Suborder: Polyphaga
- Infraorder: Elateriformia
- Family: Buprestidae
- Genus: Acmaeodera
- Species: A. acanthicola

Binomial name
- Acmaeodera acanthicola Barr, 1972

Species of beetle

Acmaeodera acanthicola is a species of metallic wood-boring beetle in the family Buprestidae. It is found in Central America and North America. Adult hosts include Prosopis and Parkinsonia, and larval host is Celtis.
