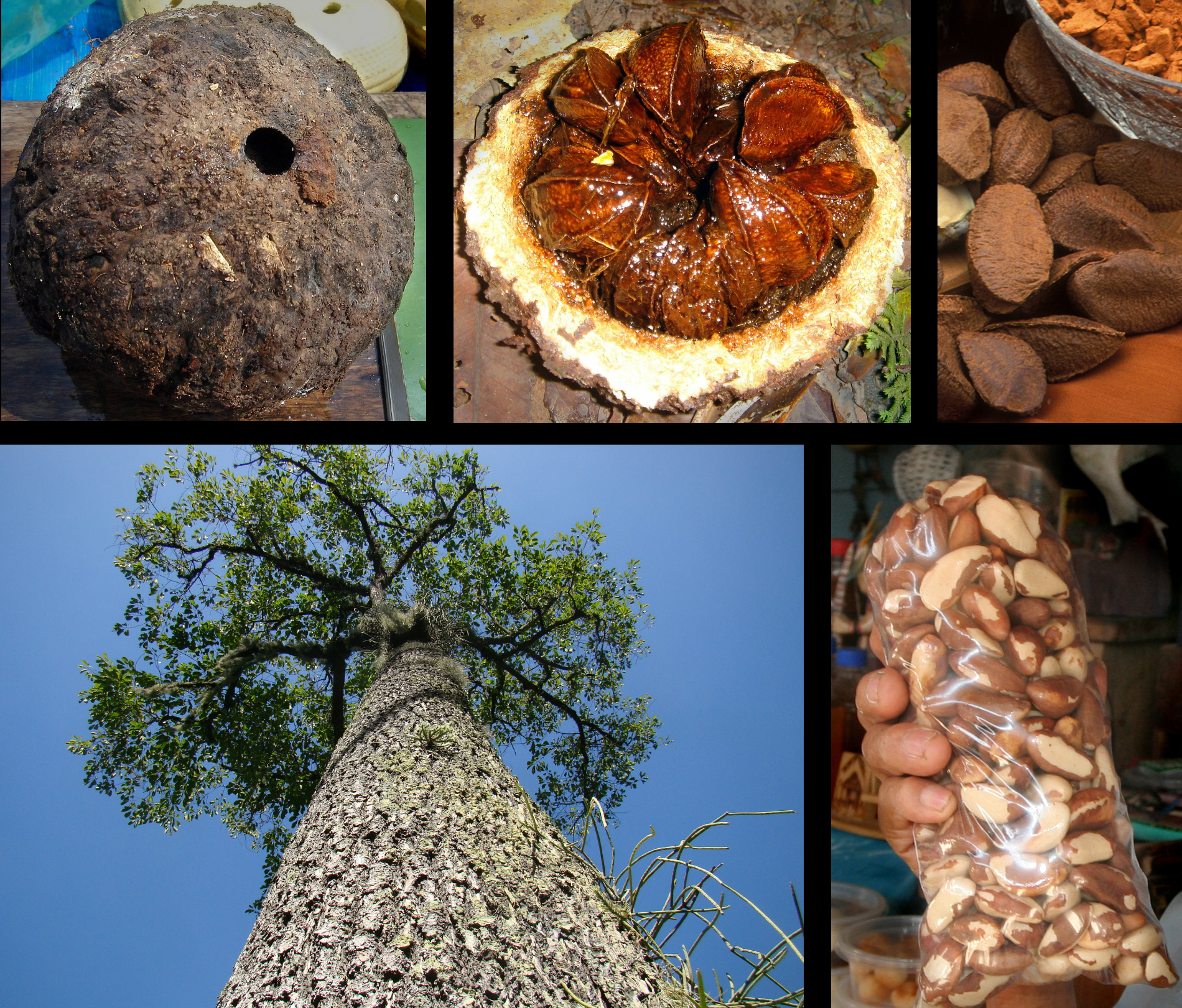

Conservation status
- Vulnerable (IUCN 2.3)

Scientific classification
- Kingdom: Plantae
- Clade: Tracheophytes
- Clade: Angiosperms
- Clade: Eudicots
- Clade: Asterids
- Order: Ericales
- Family: Lecythidaceae
- Genus: Bertholletia; Bonpl.
- Species: B. excelsa

Binomial name
- Bertholletia excelsa Humb. & Bonpl.

= Brazil nut =

Brazil nut tree

Species of tree and its edible seeds

Brazil nut (Bertholletia excelsa) refers to a South American tree of the monotypic genus Bertholletia in the family Lecythidaceae as well as the tree's commercially-harvested edible seeds. It is one of the largest and longest-lived trees in the Amazon rainforest. The fruit and its nutshell – containing the edible nut – are relatively large and weigh as much as 2 kg (4.4 lb) in total. As food, Brazil nuts are notable for diverse content of micronutrients, especially a high amount of selenium. The wood of the Brazil nut tree is prized for its quality in carpentry, flooring, and heavy construction.

In 2024, the world production of Brazil nuts was 79,736 tonnes, with Brazil and Bolivia combined accounting for 87% of the total.

== Common names ==
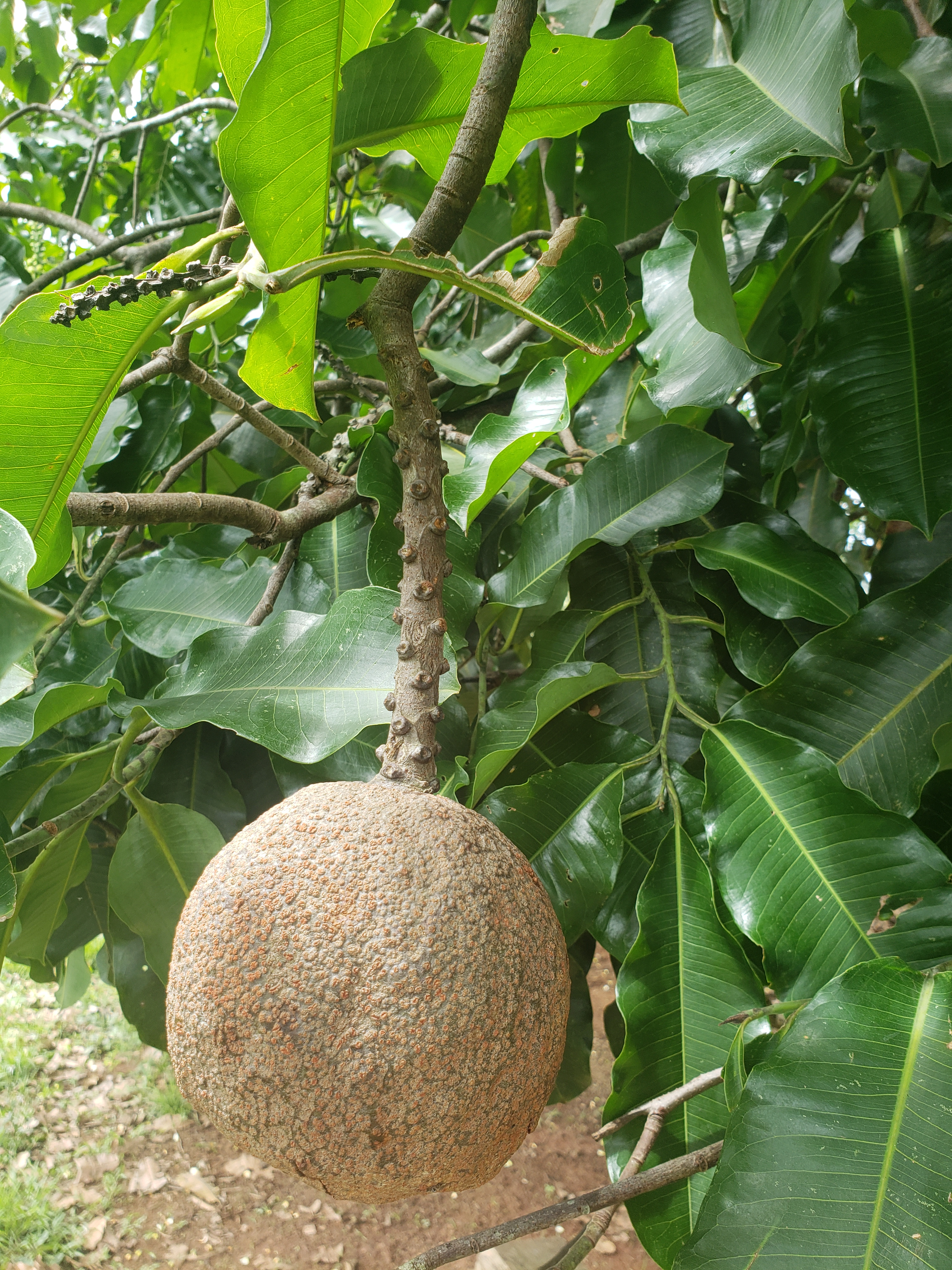
Brazil nut fruit attached to branch

In Portuguese-speaking countries, like Brazil, they are variously called "castanha-do-brasil" (meaning "chestnut from Brazil" in Portuguese), "castanha-do-pará" (meaning "chestnut from Pará" in Portuguese), castanha-da-amazônia, castanha-do-acre, "noz amazônica" (meaning "Amazonian nut" in Portuguese), noz boliviana, tocari (probably of Carib origin), and tururi (from Tupi turu'ri).

In various Spanish-speaking countries of South America, Brazil nuts are called castañas de Brasil, nuez de Brasil, or castañas de Pará (or Para), and also nuez amazónica or castaña amazónica ("Amazon nut").

In North America, as early as 1896, Brazil nuts were sometimes known by the slang term "nigger toes", a vulgarity that fell out of use after the racial slur became socially unacceptable.

== Description ==
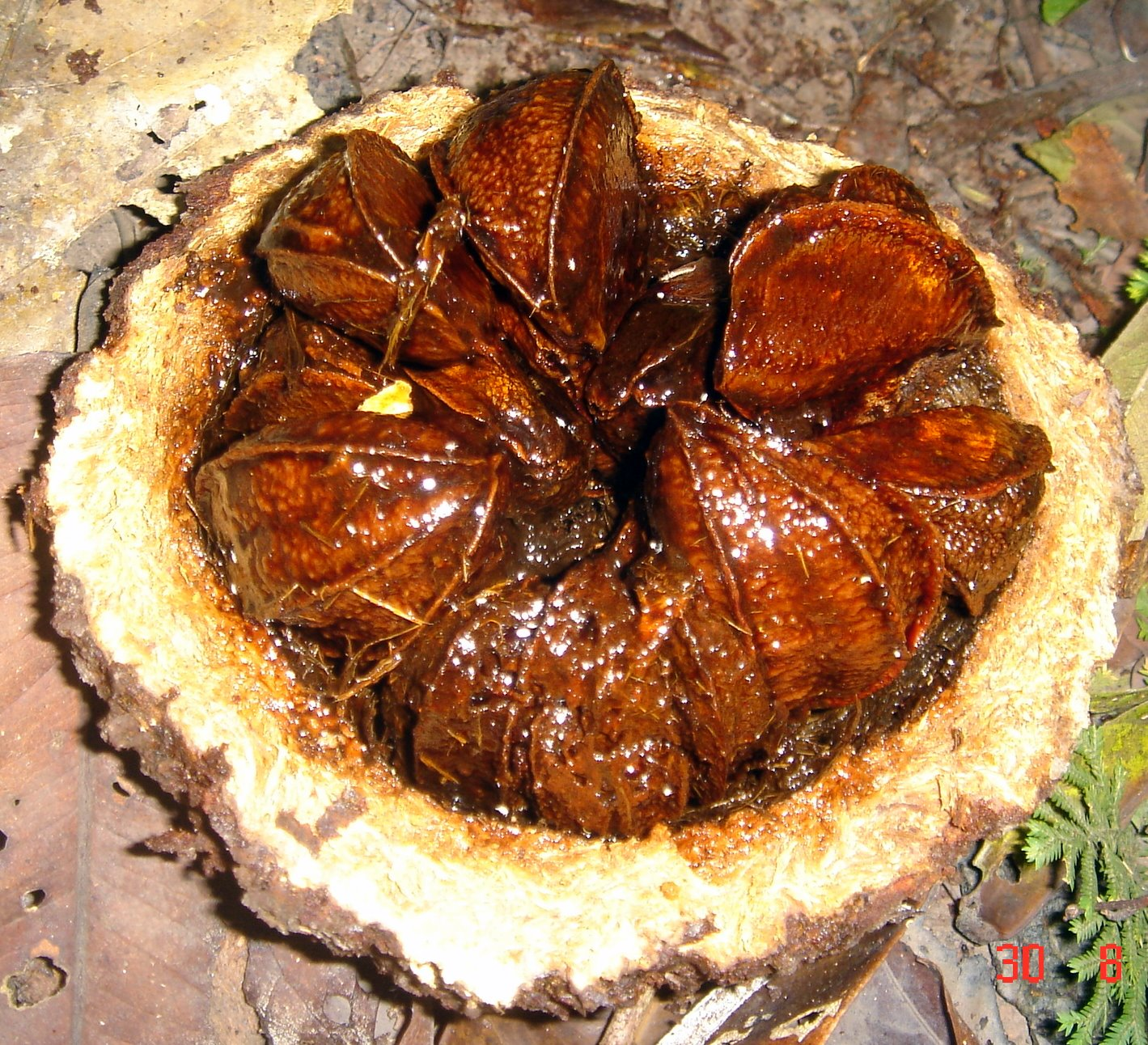
Freshly cut Brazil nut fruit

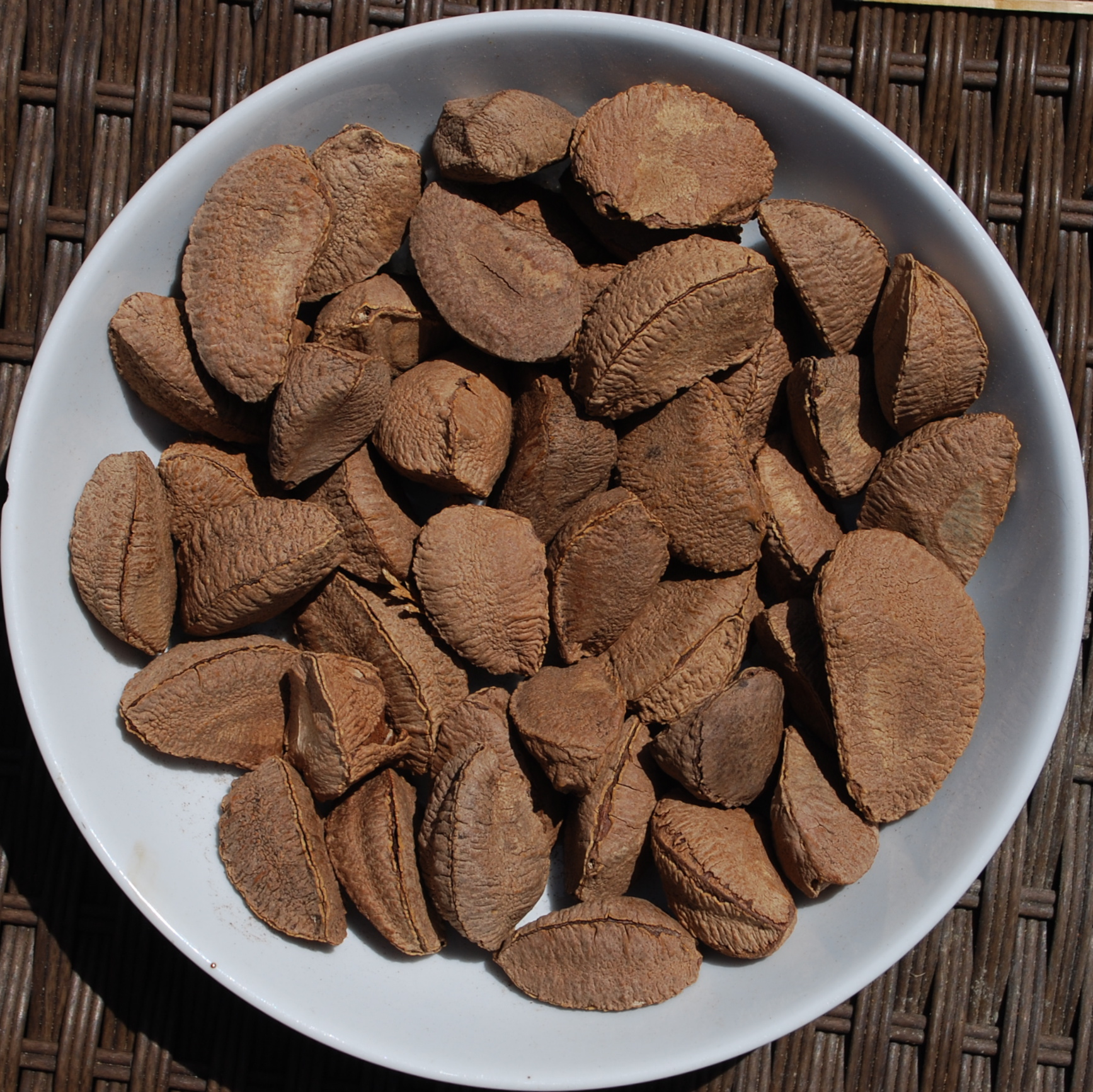
Brazil nuts in shell

The Brazil nut is a large tree, reaching 50 metres (160 feet) tall, with a trunk 1 to 2 m (3 to 7 ft) in diameter, making it among the largest of trees in the Amazon rainforest. It may live for 500 years or more, and can often reach a thousand years of age. The stem is straight and commonly without branches for well over half the tree's height, with a large, emergent crown of long branches above the surrounding canopy of other trees.

The bark is grayish and smooth. The leaves are dry-season deciduous, alternate, simple, entire or crenate, oblong, 20–35 centimetres (8–14 in) long, and 10–15 cm (4–6 in) broad. The flowers are small, greenish-white, in panicles 5–10 cm (2–4 in) long; each flower has a two-parted, deciduous calyx, six unequal cream-colored petals, and numerous stamens united into a broad, hood-shaped mass.

=== Reproduction ===
Brazil nut trees produce fruit almost exclusively in pristine forests, as disturbed forests lack the large-bodied bees of the genera Bombus, Centris, Epicharis, Eulaema, and Xylocopa, which are the only ones capable of pollinating the tree's flowers, with different bee genera being the primary pollinators in different areas, and different times of year. Brazil nuts have been harvested from plantations, but production is low and is currently not economically viable.

The fruit takes 14 months to mature after pollination of the flowers. The fruit itself is a large capsule 10–15 cm (4–6 in) in diameter, resembling a coconut endocarp in size and weighing up to 2 kg (4 lb 7 oz). It has a hard, woody shell 8–12 mm (3/8–1/2 in) thick, which contains eight to 24 wedge-shaped seeds 4–5 cm (1 5/8–2 in) long (the "Brazil nuts") packed like the segments of an orange, but not limited to one whorl of segments. Up to three whorls can be stacked onto each other, with the polar ends of the segments of the middle whorl nestling into the upper and lower whorls (see illustration above).

The capsule contains a small hole at one end, which enables large rodents like the agouti to gnaw it open. They then eat some of the seeds inside while burying others for later use; some of these are able to germinate into new Brazil nut trees. Most of the seeds are "planted" by the agoutis in caches during wet season, and the young saplings may have to wait years, in a state of dormancy, for a tree to fall and sunlight to reach it, when it starts growing again.

== Taxonomy ==
The Brazil nut family, the Lecythidaceae, is in the order Ericales, as are other well-known plants such as blueberries, cranberries, sapote, gutta-percha, tea, phlox, and persimmons. The tree is the only species in the monotypic genus Bertholletia, named after French chemist Claude Louis Berthollet.

== Distribution and habitat ==
The Brazil nut is native to the Guianas, Venezuela, Brazil, eastern Colombia, eastern Peru, and eastern Bolivia. It occurs as scattered trees in large forests on the banks of the Amazon River, Rio Negro, Tapajós, and the Orinoco. The fruit is heavy and rigid; when the fruits fall, they pose a serious threat to vehicles and potential for traumatic brain injury of people passing under the tree.

== Production ==
Brazil nut production 2024, tonnes
| Brazil | 34,909 |
| Bolivia | 33,980 |
| Peru | 10,846 |
| World | 79,736 |
Source: FAOSTAT of the United Nations

In 2024, world production of Brazil nuts (in shells) was 79,736 tonnes, most of which derived from tropical Amazon forest regions of Brazil and Bolivia, which together produced 87% of the total (table).

Brazil nuts are traded both in-shell and shelled. Brazil is the main exporter of in-shell nuts, while Bolivia and Peru are the principal exporters of shelled kernels, reflecting a larger processing sector in the latter two countries. In 2024 the global Brazil nut export market was valued at about US$326 million, with Bolivia accounting for the largest share at 54% of total export value.

Production of brazil nuts

=== Environmental effects of harvesting ===
Since most of the production for international trade is harvested in the wild, the business arrangement has been advanced as a model for generating income from a tropical forest without destroying it. The nuts are most often gathered by migrant workers known as castañeros (in Spanish) or castanheiros (in Portuguese). Logging is a significant threat to the sustainability of the Brazil nut–harvesting industry.

Analysis of tree ages in areas that are harvested shows that moderate and intense gathering takes so many seeds that not enough are left to replace older trees as they die. Sites with light gathering activities had many young trees, while sites with intense gathering practices had nearly none.

== Toxicity ==
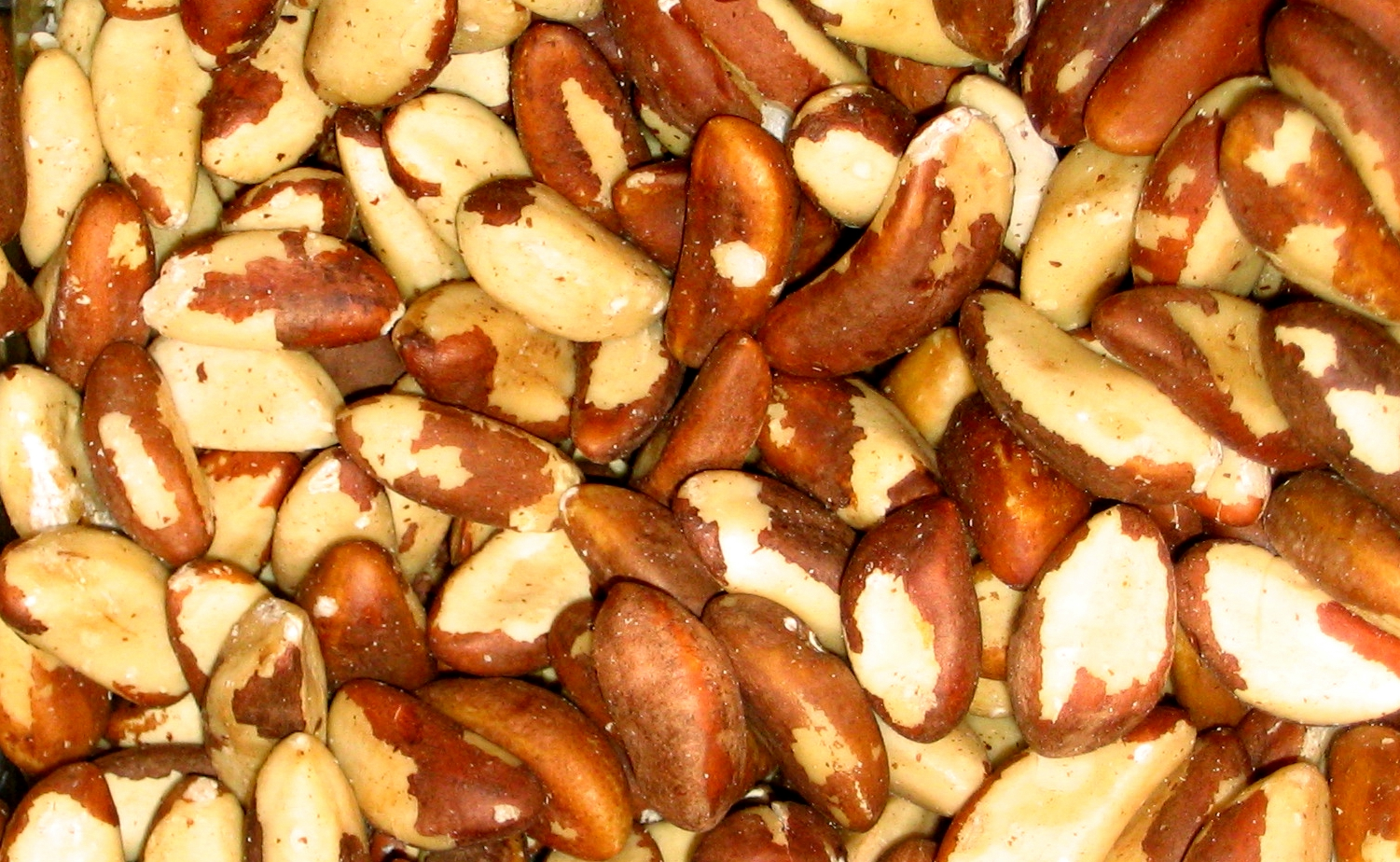
Brazil nuts after shell removal

Brazil nuts are susceptible to contamination by aflatoxins, produced by fungi, once they fall to the ground. Aflatoxins can cause liver damage, including possible cancer, if consumed. Aflatoxin levels have been found in Brazil nuts during inspections that were far higher than the limits set by the EU. However, mechanical sorting and drying was found to eliminate 98% of aflatoxins; a 2003 EU ban on importation was rescinded after new tolerance levels were set.

The nuts may contain traces of radium, a radioactive element, with a kilogram of nuts containing an activity between 40 and 260 becquerels (1 and 7 nanocuries); although a small dose of radium, this exposure is higher than in common foods. According to Oak Ridge Associated Universities, elevated levels of radium in the soil do not directly cause the concentration of radium, but "the very extensive root system of the tree" can concentrate naturally occurring radioactive material, when present in the soil. Radium can be concentrated in nuts only if it is present in the soil.

Brazil nuts also contain barium, a metal with a chemical behavior quite similar to radium. While barium can have toxic side effects when ingested (weakness, vomiting, diarrhea, etc.) the amount present in Brazil nuts is too small to have noticeable health effects.

== Nutrition ==
Brazil nuts, dried, unblanched, shelled
Nutritional value per 100 g (3.5 oz)
- Energy: 2,743 kJ (656 kcal)
- Carbohydrates: 12.27 g
- Starch: 0.25 g
- Sugars: 2.33 g
- Dietary fiber: 7.5 g
- Fat: 66.43 g
- Saturated: 15.137 g
- Monounsaturated: 24.548 g
- Polyunsaturated: 20.577 g
- Protein: 14.32 g
Amino acids
| Tryptophan | 0.141 g |
| Threonine | 0.362 g |
| Isoleucine | 0.516 g |
| Leucine | 1.155 g |
| Lysine | 0.492 g |
| Methionine | 1.008 g |
| Phenylalanine | 0.630 g |
| Tyrosine | 0.420 g |
| Valine | 0.756 g |
| Arginine | 2.148 g |
| Histidine | 0.386 g |
| Alanine | 0.577 g |
| Aspartic acid | 1.346 g |
| Glutamic acid | 3.147 g |
| Glycine | 0.718 g |
| Proline | 0.657 g |
| Serine | 0.683 g |
Vitamins and minerals
| Vitamins | Quantity %DV^{†} |
| Thiamine (B1) | 51% 0.617 mg |
| Riboflavin (B2) | 3% 0.035 mg |
| Niacin (B3) | 2% 0.295 mg |
| Pantothenic acid (B5) | 4% 0.184 mg |
| Vitamin B6 | 6% 0.101 mg |
| Folate (B9) | 6% 22 μg |
| Vitamin C | 1% 0.7 mg |
| Vitamin E | 38% 5.73 mg |
| Minerals | Quantity %DV^{†} |
| Calcium | 12% 160 mg |
| Iron | 14% 2.43 mg |
| Magnesium | 90% 376 mg |
| Manganese | 52% 1.2 mg |
| Phosphorus | 58% 725 mg |
| Potassium | 22% 659 mg |
| Sodium | 0% 3 mg |
| Zinc | 37% 4.06 mg |
- Other constituents: Quantity
- Water: 3.48 g
- Selenium: 1917 μg
- Beta-sitosterol: 64 mg
- Link to USDA Database entry
- ^{†}Percentages estimated using US recommendations for adults, except for potassium, which is estimated based on expert recommendation from the National Academies.

Brazil nuts are 3% water, 14% protein, 12% carbohydrates, and 66% fats (table). The fat components are 16% saturated, 24% monounsaturated, and 24% polyunsaturated (source in nutrition table).

In a reference amount of 100 grams (3.5 oz), Brazil nuts supply 659 calories, and are a rich source (20% or more of the Daily Value, DV) of thiamin, vitamin E, magnesium, phosphorus, manganese, potassium, and zinc. Calcium and iron are present in moderate amounts (10–19% DV; table).

=== Selenium ===
Brazil nuts are a particularly rich source of selenium, with just 28 g (0.99 oz) – a standard serving of around 6 to 8 nuts, depending on size – has an average of 544 micrograms of selenium or 10 times the DV of 55 micrograms (nutrition table). However, the amount of selenium within batches of nuts may vary considerably.

The high selenium content is used as a biomarker in studies of selenium intake and deficiency. Consumption of just one Brazil nut per day over 8 weeks was sufficient to restore selenium blood levels and increase HDL cholesterol in obese women.

=== Oil ===
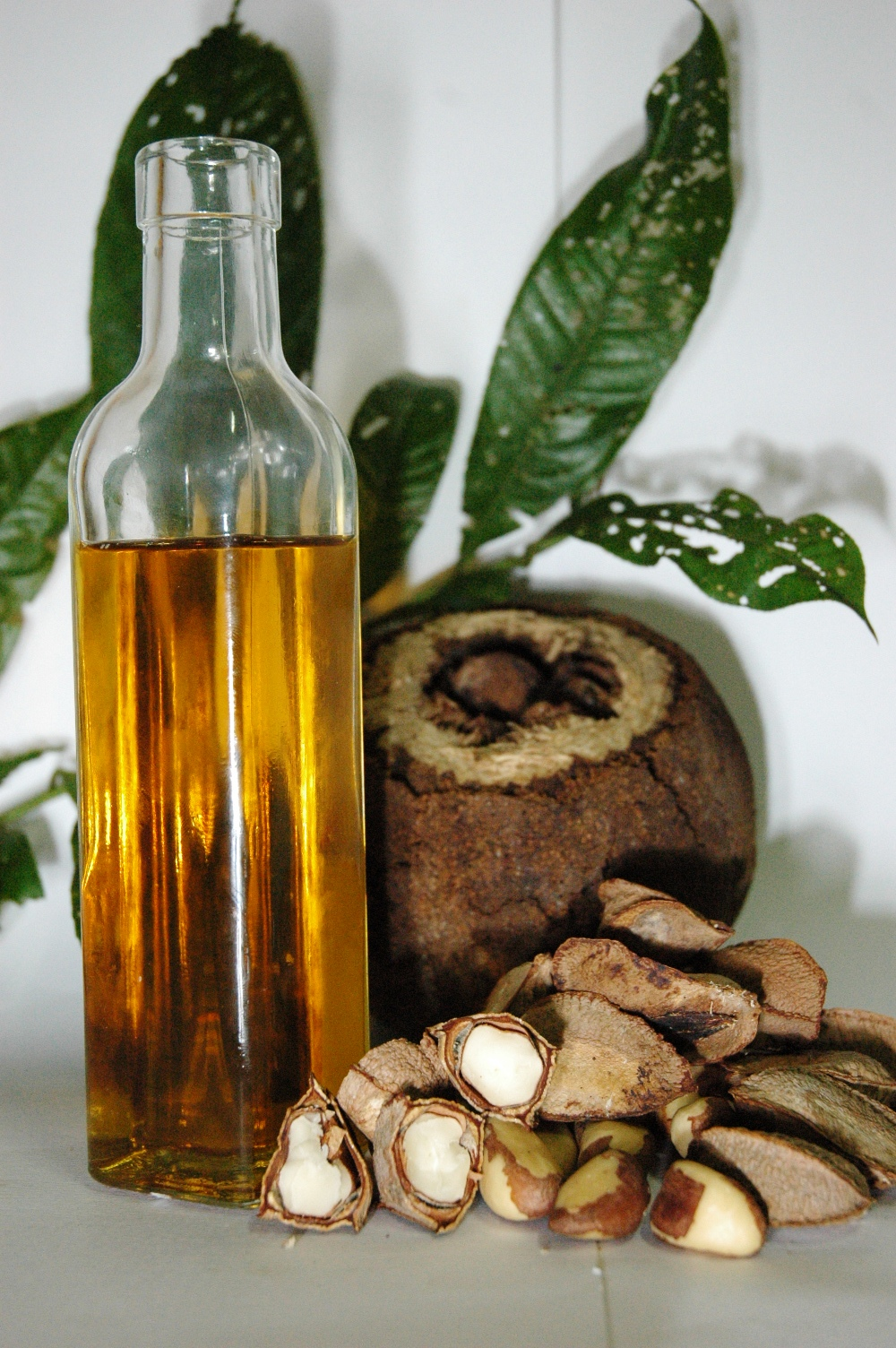
Brazil nut oil

Brazil nut oil contains 82% unsaturated fatty acids, composed mainly of oleic and linoleic acids, as well as the phytosterol beta-sitosterol and fat-soluble vitamin E.

Properties of vegetable oils The nutritional values are expressed as percent (%) by mass of total fat.
| Type | Processing treatment | Saturated fatty acids | Monounsaturated fatty acids | | Polyunsaturated fatty acids | | | | Smoke point |
| Type | Processing treatment | Saturated fatty acids | Total | Oleic acid (ω−9) | Total | α-Linolenic acid (ω−3) | Linoleic acid (ω−6) | ω−6:3 ratio | Smoke point |
|---|---|---|---|---|---|---|---|---|---|
| Avocado | | 11.6 | 70.6 | 67.9 | 13.5 | 1 | 12.5 | 12.5:1 | 250 °C (482 °F) |
| Brazil nut | | 17.6 | 26.7 | 26.1 | 55.7 | 0.1 | 55.6 | 457:1 | 208 °C (406 °F) |
| Canola | | 7.4 | 63.3 | 61.8 | 28.1 | 9.1 | 18.6 | 2:1 | 204 °C (400 °F) |
| Coconut | | 82.5 | 6.3 | 6 | 1.7 | 0.019 | 1.68 | 88:1 | 175 °C (347 °F) |
| Corn | | 12.9 | 27.6 | 27.3 | 54.7 | 1 | 58 | 58:1 | 232 °C (450 °F) |
| Cottonseed | | 25.9 | 17.8 | 19 | 51.9 | 1 | 54 | 54:1 | 216 °C (420 °F) |
| Cottonseed | hydrogenated | 93.6 | 1.5 | | 0.6 | 0.2 | 0.3 | 1.5:1 | |
| Flaxseed/linseed | | 9.0 | 18.4 | 18 | 67.8 | 53 | 13 | 0.2:1 | 107 °C (225 °F) |
| Grape seed | | 9.6 | 16.1 | 15.8 | 69.9 | 0.10 | 69.6 | very high | 216 °C (421 °F) |
| Hemp seed | | 7.0 | 9.0 | 9.0 | 82.0 | 22.0 | 54.0 | 2.5:1 | 166 °C (330 °F) |
| High-oleic safflower oil | | 7.5 | 75.2 | 75.2 | 12.8 | 0 | 12.8 | very high | 212 °C (414 °F) |
| Olive (extra virgin) | | 13.8 | 73.0 | 71.3 | 10.5 | 0.7 | 9.8 | 14:1 | 193 °C (380 °F) |
| Palm | | 49.3 | 37.0 | 40 | 9.3 | 0.2 | 9.1 | 45.5:1 | 235 °C (455 °F) |
| Palm | hydrogenated | 88.2 | 5.7 | | 0 | | | | |
| Peanut | | 16.2 | 57.1 | 55.4 | 19.9 | 0.318 | 19.6 | 61.6:1 | 232 °C (450 °F) |
| Rice bran oil | | 25 | 38.4 | 38.4 | 36.6 | 2.2 | 34.4 | 15.6:1 | 232 °C (450 °F) |
| Sesame | | 14.2 | 39.7 | 39.3 | 41.7 | 0.3 | 41.3 | 138:1 | |
| Soybean | | 15.6 | 22.8 | 22.6 | 57.7 | 7 | 51 | 7.3:1 | 238 °C (460 °F) |
| Soybean | partially hydrogenated | 14.9 | 43.0 | 42.5 | 37.6 | 2.6 | 34.9 | 13.4:1 | |
| Sunflower oil | | 8.99 | 63.4 | 62.9 | 20.7 | 0.16 | 20.5 | 128:1 | 227 °C (440 °F) |
| Walnut oil | unrefined | 9.1 | 22.8 | 22.2 | 63.3 | 10.4 | 52.9 | 5:1 | 160 °C (320 °F) |

== Uses ==
=== Wood ===
The lumber from Brazil nut trees (not to be confused with Brazilwood) is of excellent quality, having diverse uses from flooring to heavy construction. Logging the trees is prohibited by law in all three producing countries (Brazil, Bolivia, and Peru). Illegal extraction of timber and land clearances present continuing threats. In Brazil, cutting down a Brazil nut tree requires previous authorization from the Brazilian Institute of Environment and Renewable Natural Resources.

=== Other uses ===
Brazil nut oil is used as a lubricant in clocks and in the manufacturing of paint and cosmetics, such as soap and perfume.

Because of its hardness, the Brazil nutshell is often pulverized and used as an abrasive to polish materials, such as metals and ceramics, in the same way as jeweler's rouge, while charcoal from the shells can be used to purify water.

== Gallery ==
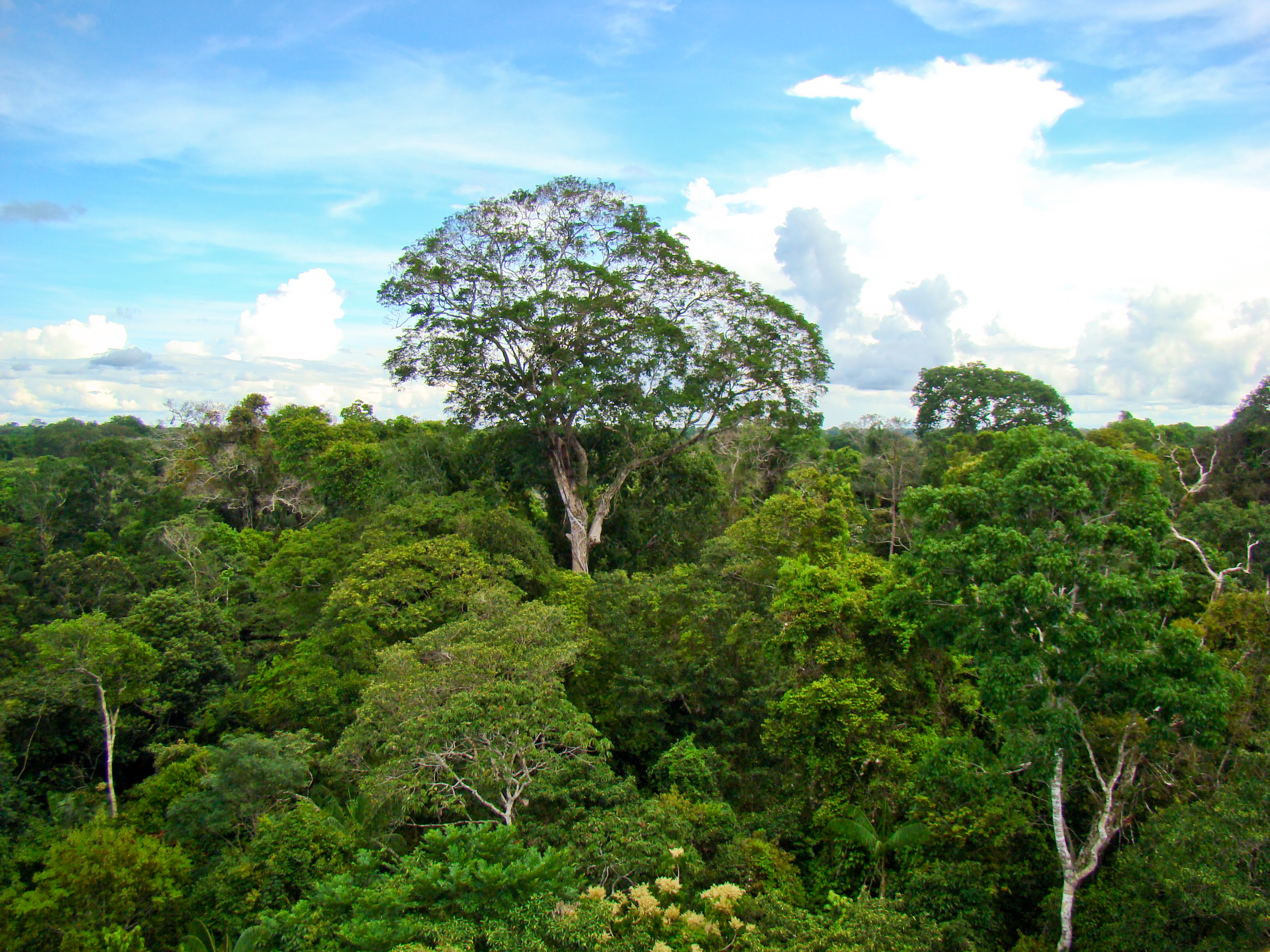
Brazil nut tree in Amazon rainforest, Peru

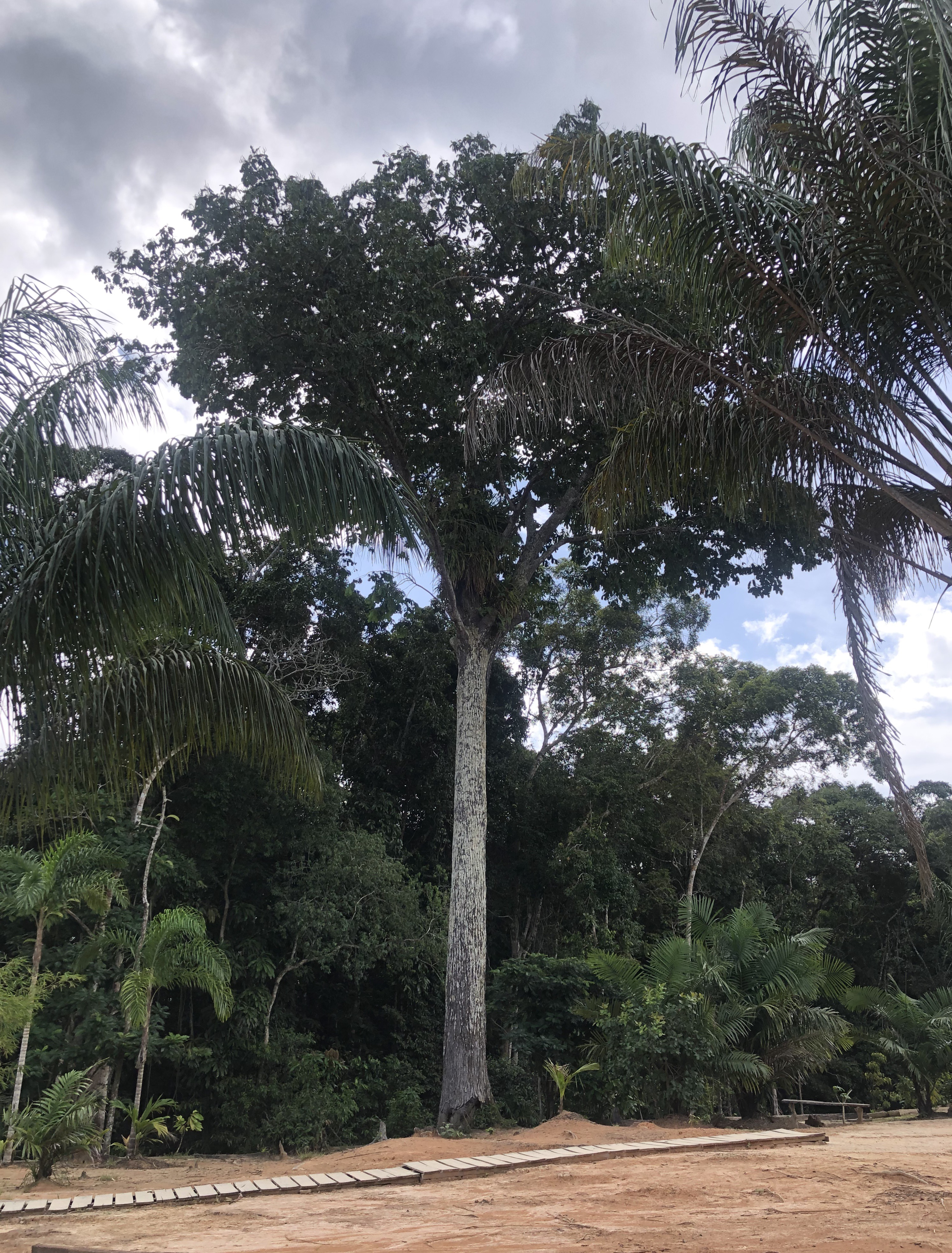
Brazil nut tree, Brazil

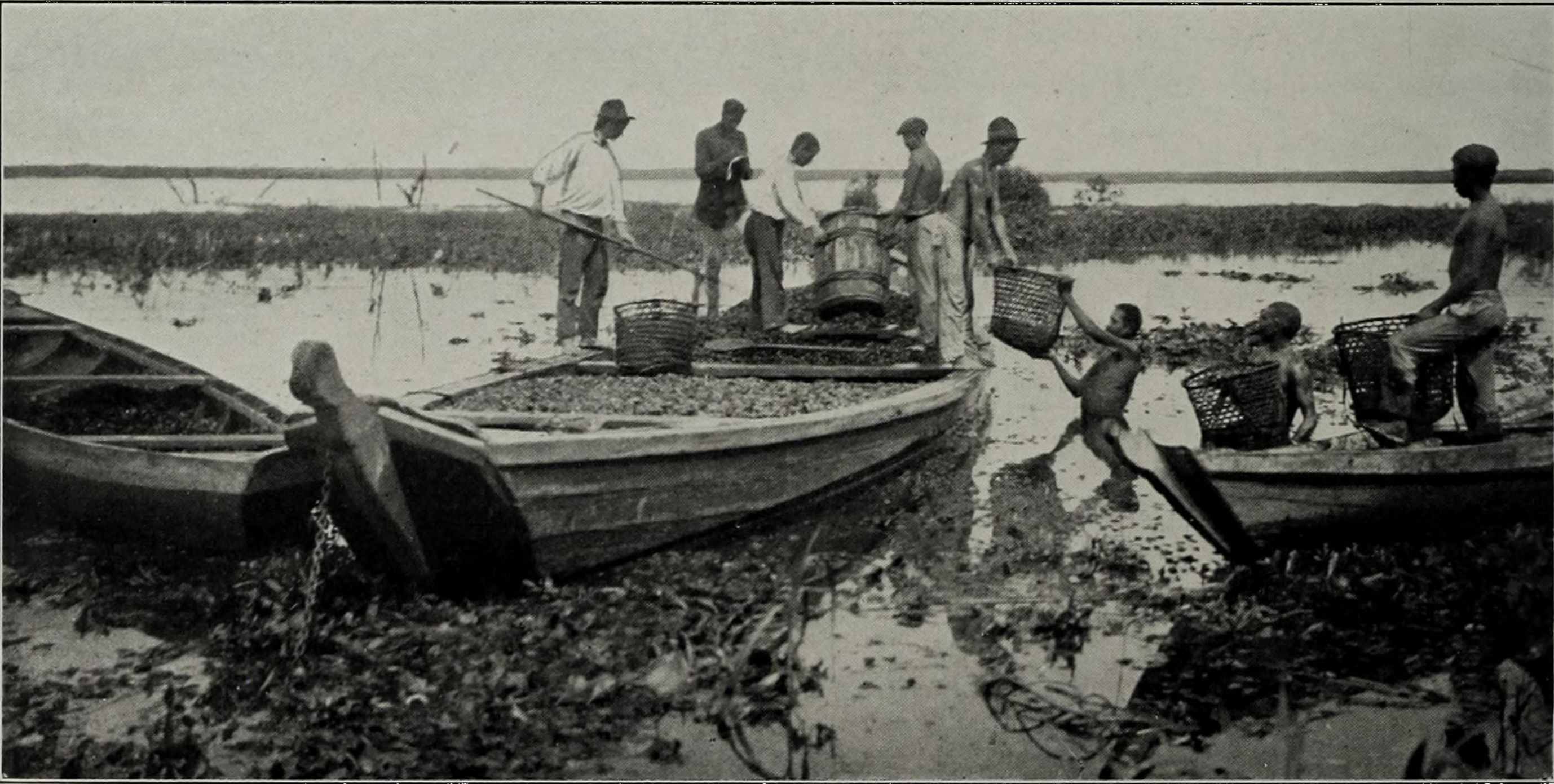
Brazil nuts being loaded onto flatboats, early 20th century

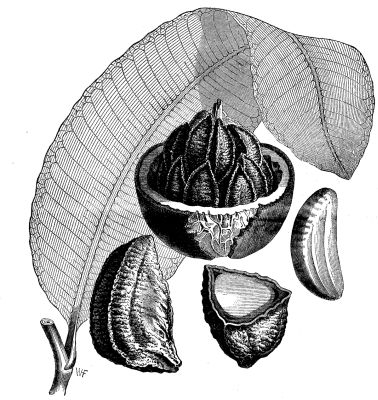
Depiction of the Brazil nut in Scientific American Supplement, No. 598, June 18, 1887

== See also ==
- Brazil nut cake
- List of culinary nuts
- Official list of endangered flora of Brazil
- Granular convection, also known as the "Brazil nut effect"
