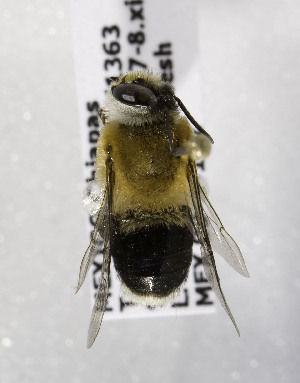
- Centris analis pinned specimen

Scientific classification
- Domain: Eukaryota
- Kingdom: Animalia
- Phylum: Arthropoda
- Class: Insecta
- Order: Hymenoptera
- Family: Apidae
- Genus: Centris
- Species: C. analis

Binomial name
- Centris analis Fabricius, 1804

= Centris analis =

Species of bee

Centris analis is a solitary, oil-collecting bee with a geographical range extending from Brazil to Mexico. C. analis is a small, fast-flying bee with an average head width of 3.21mm and 3.54mm for males and females, respectively. While most species of the genus Centris create burrows for nesting, C. analis and other species of the subgenus Heterocentris build nests in pre-existing cavities rather than in the ground. C. analis is a pollinator of many plant species, especially of those in the family Malpighiaceae, which has encouraged its application in acerola orchards.

== Habitat ==
Centris analis is a habitat generalist as it has been found living in a wide variety of different habitats. Frankie et al. examined the habitat preferences of Centris species in Costa Rica and C. analis was found in equal abundances across a wide variety of habitats including dry deciduous forest, riparian forest, savanna, mesic forest, and regenerative forest. In Brazil, C. analis has been observed in regions with distinct differences in environmental conditions including the rainforest, caatinga, and cerrado. C. analis has also been studied in urban environments.

== Diet ==
Larvae feed on pollen and nectar which are foraged by adult females and stocked inside brood cells where the larvae develop. While larvae feed on pollen and nectar, adults only feed on nectar. Females collect pollen from a wide variety of species and families but display a preference for species of the Malpighiaceae family which includes the popular acerola shrubs. Malpighiaceae plants also produce floral oils which females use in constructing their nests. While pollen and oils are primarily obtained from Malpighiaceae species, nectar is collected from other plants of the families Fabaceae, Verbenaceae, Convolvulaceae, and Bignoniaceae.

== Reproduction ==
=== Cavity search ===
After mating, females spend lots of time finding a suitable cavity for nesting, often inspecting many before choosing one. One factor affecting cavity choice is the presence of landmarks which females rely on to find their nest. Other factors affecting cavity choice include substrate, shade, and entrance orientation with females preferring wood cavities in shaded areas with the cavity entrance orientated in the same direction as the wind. While length of cavity varies between nests, females mainly choose cavities with a diameter of six to eight millimeters. C. analis can use a variety of small cavities to build nests in including old nests originally created by other bees and wasps, cavities made by woodboring beetles, and artificial trap nests which are specifically designed to attract and build populations of cavity-nesting bees.

=== Nesting and oviposition ===
Nest building occurs in a specific pattern where females first obtain plant material and oils to create a brood cell at the bottom of the cavity. Cells are created by plastering the plant fragments and oil against the inner surfaces of the cavity and a cell partition is created with a small hole left in it to allow the female to insert resources and eventually oviposit through. After the cell walls are made, the female forages for pollen and nectar and stores a large amount of both within the cell. Once the cell has enough pollen and nectar to feed the offspring throughout its development, the female will oviposit in the cell and close the cell partition. This cell construction process is repeated many times to fill the cavity with brood cells and once the last cell is complete, the female uses more plant material to create a plug in the cavity entrance. Once the nest is sealed, the female begins searching for another cavity to create a new nest in. It takes two to four days for a female to build a single nest and the nesting period usually spans between May and October but can occur all year in certain places with optimal climate conditions and high resource abundances year-round.

Artificial trap nests have been used extensively to study the nesting behavior of C. analis as females are highly attracted to them. Trap nests have also been used in agricultural systems to establish populations of C. analis which help increase plant pollination and fruit production.

=== Offspring development ===
After nests are complete, it takes around 46 days for offspring to start emerging as adults and after approximately 74 days, all offspring will have emerged. As a haplodiploid organism, females can control the sex of their offspring. Therefore, females will produce males in the outermost cells while females occur in the innermost cells resulting in males leaving the nest first.

== Natural enemies ==
=== Kleptoparasites ===
Kleptoparasitism occurs when a female of another insect species infiltrates a C. analis nest and lays an egg in the outermost brood cell. The egg eventually hatches and the larva feeds on the stored pollen and nectar as well as the larva or egg within the cell. Kleptoparasites of C. analis include Mesocheira bicolor, Coelioxys species, and Leucospis species.

=== Brood parasites ===
Centris analis females may infiltrate the nests created by other females and perform brood parasitism. In brood parasitism, a female will remove the nest plug, enter the nest, open the first brood cell, and consume the egg within it. Following egg consumption, the female will oviposit in the cell and perform collecting trips to gather plant material and oils to close the cell and create a new nest plug.

== Importance ==
=== Agricultural use ===
Due to their preference for plants in the Malpighiaceae family, C. analis populations have been introduced to acerola orchards in Brazil to help increase plant pollination and ultimately fruit production. Magalhães and Freitas installed trap nests in an acerola orchard in Brazil and found that C. analis pollination supported a 286% increase in fruit productivity resulting in 1.8 more tons of fruit produced and an increase of $2,250USD in income. While C. analis can provide pollination services in acerola orchards, this species requires nectar as a larval and adult food source which are obtained from other plant species, and therefore, populations cannot be established without suitable nectar-producing plants.

== Websites and videos ==
=== Websites ===
- Discover Life - Centris analis
- BOLD Systems - Centris analis
- iNaturalist - Centris analis
- Global Biodiversity Information Facility - Centris analis
- Research Gate - Vieira De Jesus and Garofalo 2000 - image of a longitudinal section of a C. analis nest
- Research Gate - Alonso et al. 2012 - image of a typical trap nest featuring C. analis females

=== Videos ===
- Centris analis female moving in and out of its nest
- Trap nest with active Centris analis females
- Multiple trap nests showing female activity around individual cavities
- Trap nest video with close ups of Centris analis
