= Parkinsonia texana =

Scientific classification
- Kingdom: Plantae
- Clade: Tracheophytes
- Clade: Angiosperms
- Clade: Eudicots
- Clade: Rosids
- Order: Fabales
- Family: Fabaceae
- Subfamily: Caesalpinioideae
- Genus: Parkinsonia
- Species: P. texana

Binomial name
- Parkinsonia texana S. Watson (A. Gray)

Synonyms
- Cercidium texanum

Species of legume

Parkinsonia texana is a species of perennial flowering tree in the pea family, Fabaceae, native to Texas and the Mexican states of Coahuila, Nuevo Leon, San Luis Potosi, and Tamaulipas. Common names include Texas palo verde, Border palo verde, and Retama china.

Parkinsonia texana grows as a shrub or small tree up to 7.6 m (25 ft) in height and 6 m (20 ft) in diameter. It is heat and drought tolerant and prefers alkaline soils. Its thin bark is green in color and its flowers, which are typically yellow but sometimes red, bloom from April to June.
