= Centris rhodopus =

Scientific classification
- Domain: Eukaryota
- Kingdom: Animalia
- Phylum: Arthropoda
- Class: Insecta
- Order: Hymenoptera
- Family: Apidae
- Tribe: Centridini
- Genus: Centris
- Species: C. rhodopus

Binomial name
- Centris rhodopus Cockerell, 1897

Species of bee

Centris rhodopus, the red-legged centris, is a species of centridine bee in the family Apidae. It is found in Central America and North America.
