= Centris elegans =

Scientific classification
- Domain: Eukaryota
- Kingdom: Animalia
- Phylum: Arthropoda
- Class: Insecta
- Order: Hymenoptera
- Family: Apidae
- Genus: Centris
- Species: C. elegans

Binomial name
- Centris elegans Smith, 1874

Subspecies
- Centris elegans grenadensis Cockerell, 1919

Species of bee

Centris elegans is a bee species in the genus Centris found on Saint Vincent and Grenadines.

== See also ==
- Frederick Smith (entomologist)
