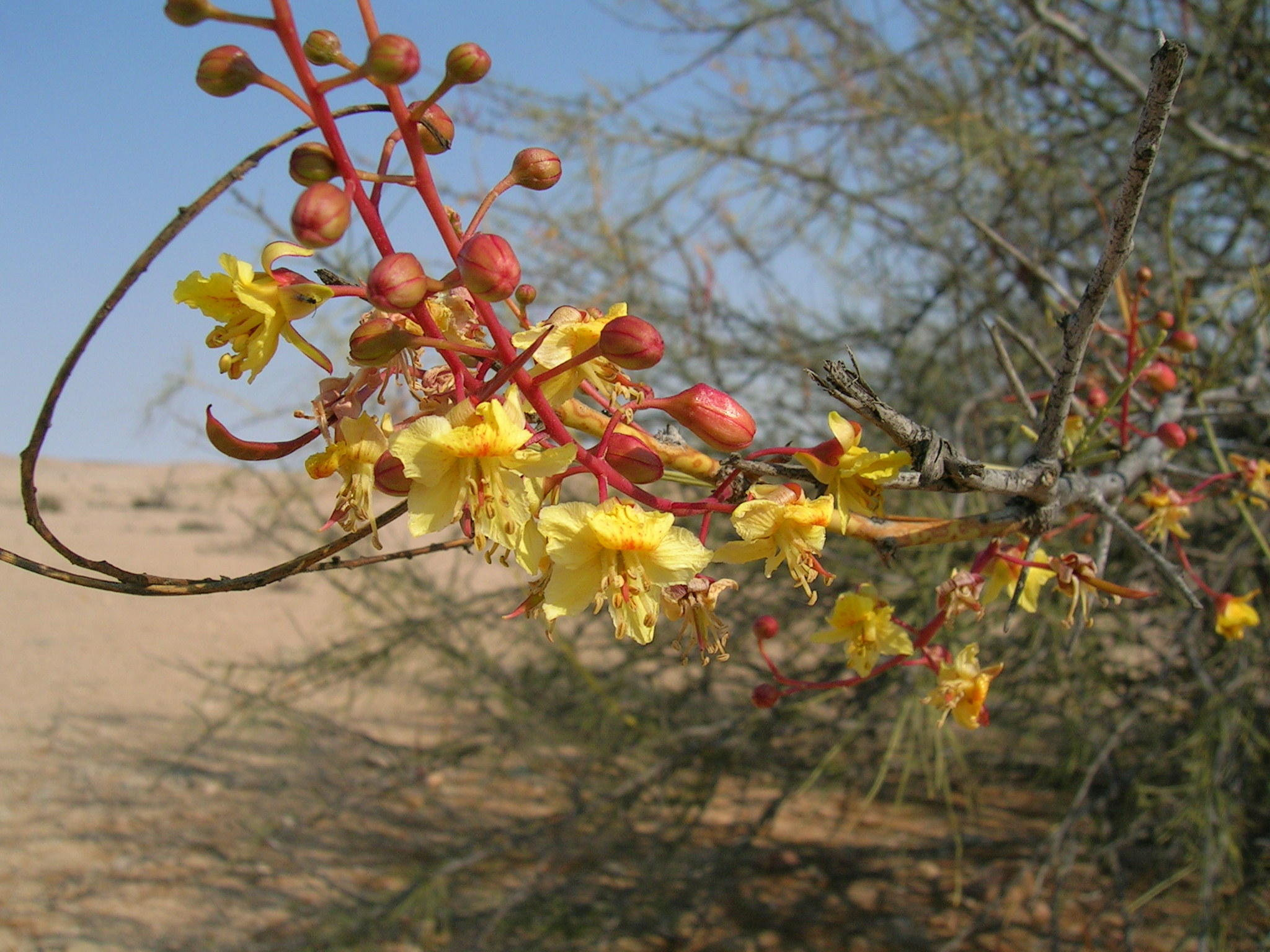

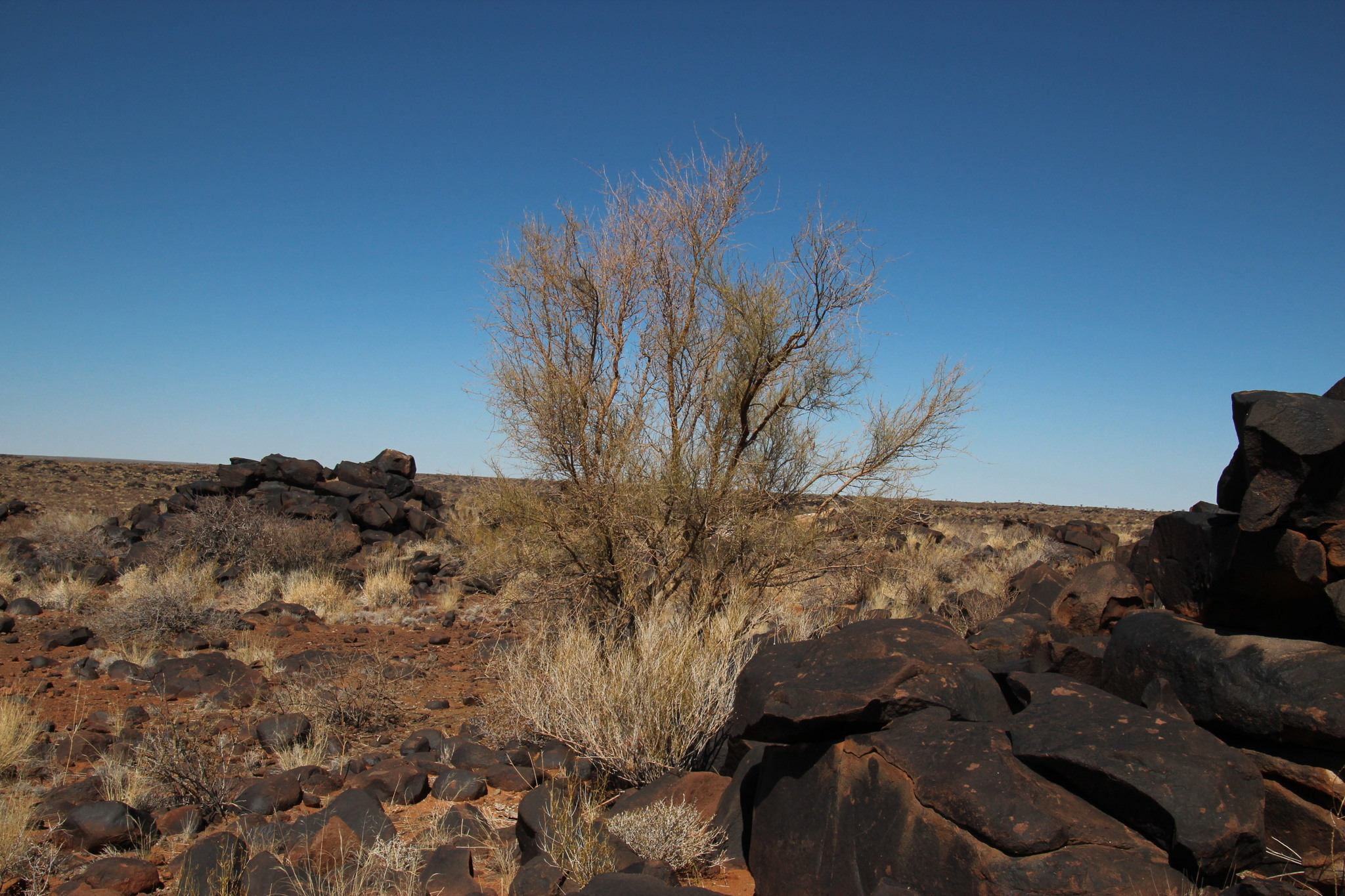

Conservation status
- Least Concern (IUCN 3.1)

Scientific classification
- Kingdom: Plantae
- Clade: Tracheophytes
- Clade: Angiosperms
- Clade: Eudicots
- Clade: Rosids
- Order: Fabales
- Family: Fabaceae
- Subfamily: Caesalpinioideae
- Genus: Parkinsonia
- Species: P. africana

Binomial name
- Parkinsonia africana Sond.

= Parkinsonia africana =

Species of legume

Parkinsonia africana, the green-hair tree, is a species of flowering plant in the family Fabaceae, native to southern Angola, Botswana, and Namibia, and the Cape Provinces and Northern Provinces of South Africa. It is a bush growing 1–3m tall with green bark that allows for photosynthesis when the leaves are shed. It produces yellow flowers and yellow to brown pods. The wood does not crack when hot and is used to make smoking pipes.

== Distribution and habitat ==
P. africana is widespread in Namibia and South Africa and likely also occurs in Botswana, though it has not yet been recorded there. Within South Africa it is known from the Northern Cape and North West provinces. It grows in desert or semi-desert habitats, and is often found on sandy plains near waterways.
