= John Alcock (behavioral ecologist) =

American behavioral ecologist and author (1942–2023)

John Alcock (/ˈælkɒk/; November 13, 1942 – January 15, 2023) was an American behavioral ecologist and author. He was the Emeritus' Professor in the School of Life Sciences at Arizona State University.

His research interests include the evolution of diversity in insect populations, studying the adaptive value of different ways in which males find mating partners. He authored several books, including The Kookaburras' Song: Exploring Animal Behavior in Australia (1988), Sonoran Desert Summer (1990), The Triumph of Sociobiology (2003), and Animal Behavior: An Evolutionary Approach (tenth edition, 2013). He authored Sonoran Desert Spring (1994) which was illustrated by Marilyn Hoff Stewart, and also authored In a Desert Garden: Love and Death Among the Insects (1999) illustrated by Turid Forsyth.

Alcock was one of the original scientists to participate in the Ask A Biologist program.

Alcock performed extensive research and was the leading authority on the bee Centris pallida which is common in Arizona. Most of this research was performed in the late 1970s.

Alcock completed his undergraduate degree at Amherst College (1965) and his Ph.D. at Harvard University (1969).

Alcock died on January 15, 2023, at the age of 80.

== Books ==
- Animal Behavior: An Evolutionary Approach, Sinauer Associates. Sunderland, 2013, ISBN 978-0-87893-966-4
- An Enthusiasm for Orchids: Sex and Deception in Plant Evolution, Oxford University Press, US, 2005, ISBN 978-0-19-518274-3
- The Triumph of Sociobiology, Oxford University Press, US, 2003, ISBN 978-0-19-516335-3
