= Parkinsonia raimondoi =

Conservation status
- Near Threatened (IUCN 2.3)

Scientific classification
- Kingdom: Plantae
- Clade: Tracheophytes
- Clade: Angiosperms
- Clade: Eudicots
- Clade: Rosids
- Order: Fabales
- Family: Fabaceae
- Subfamily: Caesalpinioideae
- Genus: Parkinsonia
- Species: P. raimondoi

Binomial name
- Parkinsonia raimondoi Brenan

Species of legume

Parkinsonia raimondoi is a species of flowering plant in the pea family, Fabaceae, that is endemic to Somalia. It is threatened by habitat loss.
