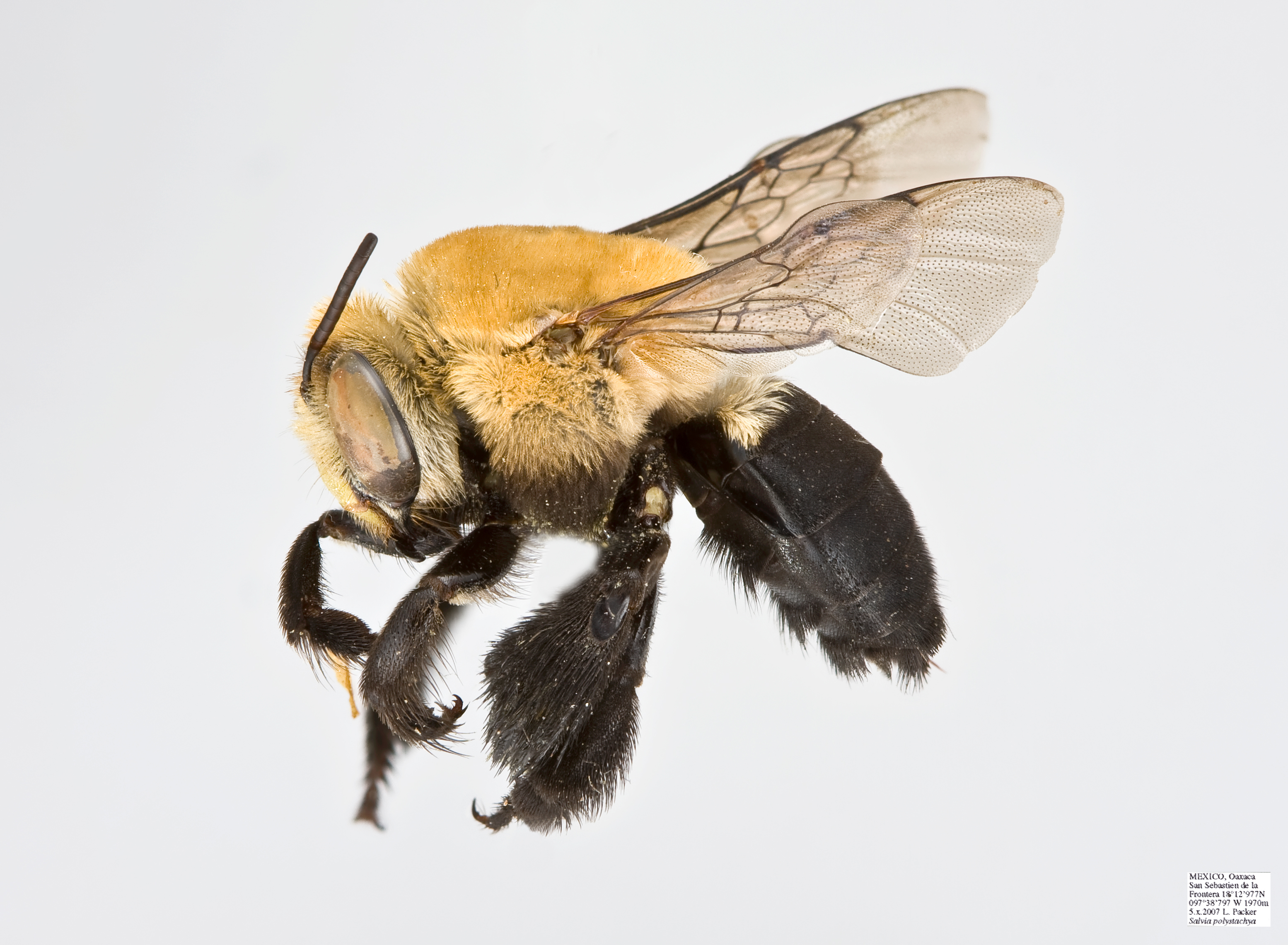

Scientific classification
- Domain: Eukaryota
- Kingdom: Animalia
- Phylum: Arthropoda
- Class: Insecta
- Order: Hymenoptera
- Family: Apidae
- Tribe: Centridini
- Genus: Centris
- Species: C. nitida

Binomial name
- Centris nitida Smith, 1874

= Centris nitida =

Species of bee

Centris nitida is a species of centridine bee in the family Apidae. It is found in Central America. It has also been introduced to the US state of Florida.

== Subspecies ==
These two subspecies belong to the species Centris nitida:

- Centris nitida geminata Cockerell
- Centris nitida nitida
