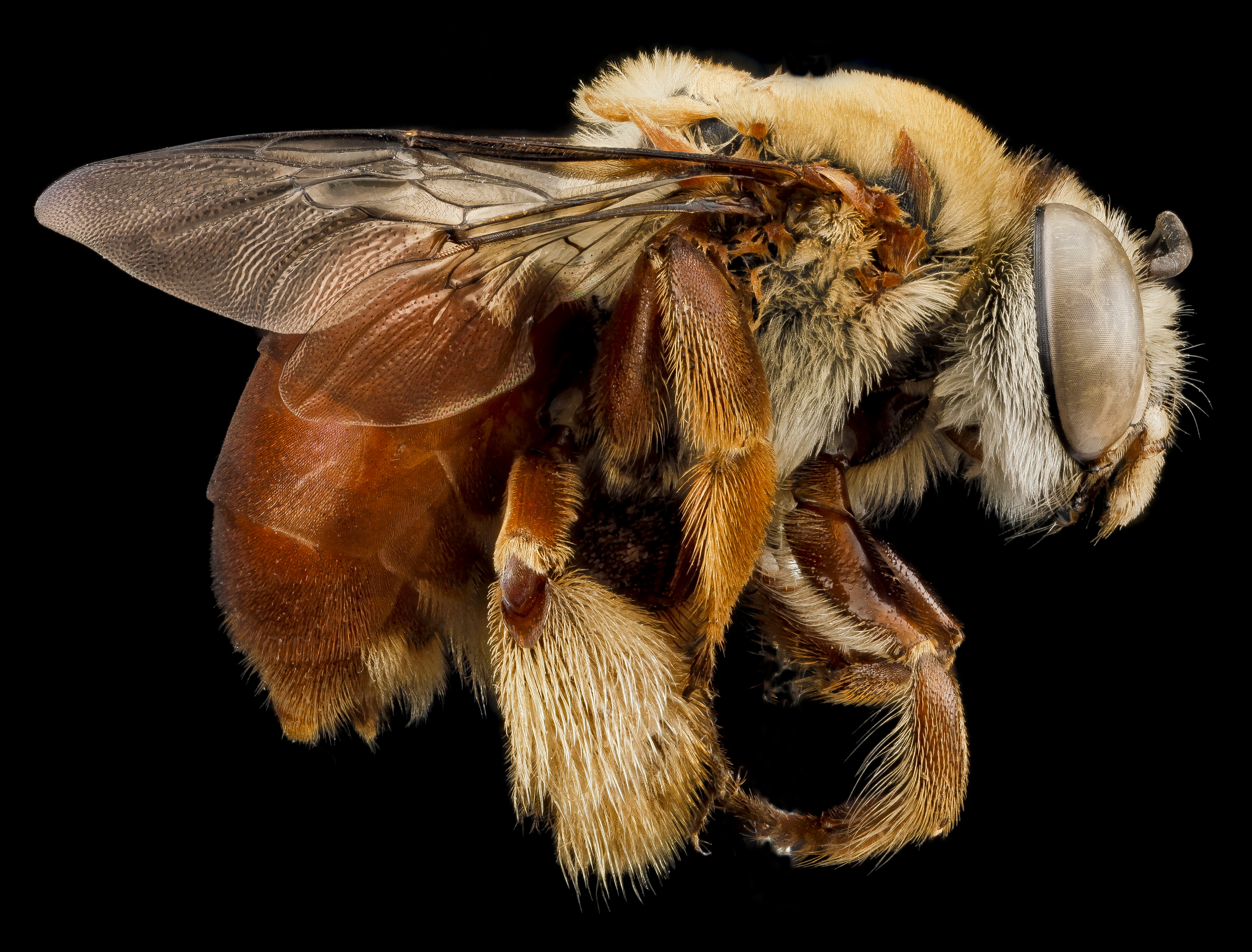

Conservation status
- Vulnerable (NatureServe)

Scientific classification
- Domain: Eukaryota
- Kingdom: Animalia
- Phylum: Arthropoda
- Class: Insecta
- Order: Hymenoptera
- Family: Apidae
- Tribe: Centridini
- Genus: Centris
- Species: C. errans

Binomial name
- Centris errans Fox, 1899

= Centris errans =

Species of bee

Centris errans, known generally as wandering centris, is a species of centridine bee in the family Apidae. Other common names include the Florida locust-berry oil-collecting bee and spiny bear's-breech. It is found in the Caribbean and North America. The species is one of five from the family Apidae that are endemic to the state of Florida. The species occurs the southernmost portion of Florida.
