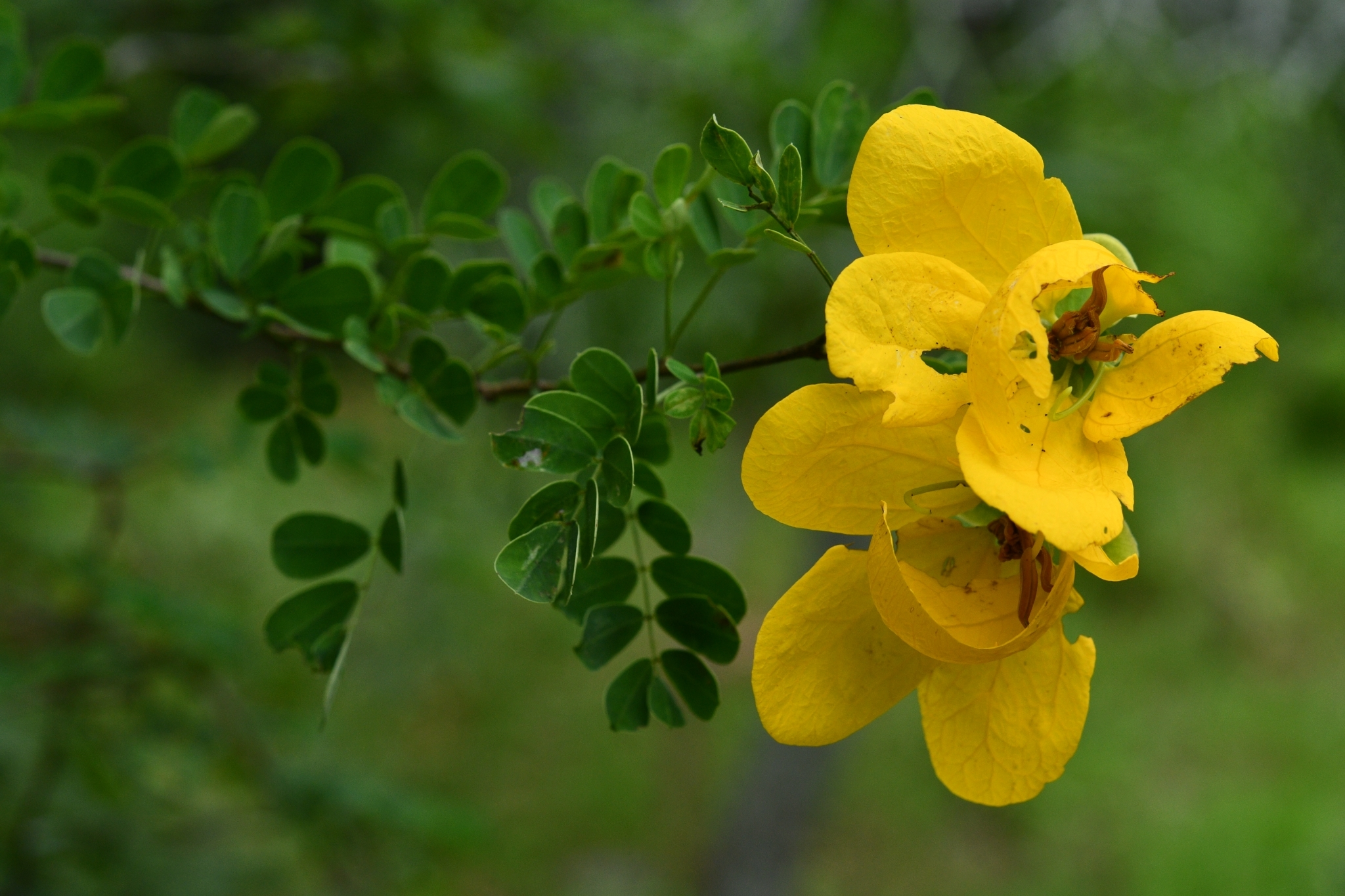

Conservation status
- Apparently Secure (NatureServe)

Scientific classification
- Kingdom: Plantae
- Clade: Embryophytes
- Clade: Tracheophytes
- Clade: Spermatophytes
- Clade: Angiosperms
- Clade: Eudicots
- Clade: Rosids
- Order: Fabales
- Family: Fabaceae
- Subfamily: Caesalpinioideae
- Genus: Senna
- Species: S. wislizeni

Binomial name
- Senna wislizeni (A.Gray) Irwin & Barneby

Synonyms
- Cassia wislizenii A.Gray; Palmerocassia wislizenii (A.Gray) Britton & Rose

= Senna wislizeni =

Species of legume

Senna wislizeni, commonly called Wislizenus' senna or shrubby senna (formerly "cassia", but this generally refers to larger Cassiinae), is a species of legume. Formerly in the wastebin taxon Cassia sensu lato, it is now placed in the genus Senna or sometimes separated in Palmerocassia together with Senna unijuga.

This is a perennial, deciduous shrub native to Chihuahua and Hidalgo in Mexico; and Texas, New Mexico, and Arizona in the U.S. It is a desert plant with good heat and drought tolerance.

Senna wislizeni can reach ten feet (3.0 meters) tall with a ten-foot spread. It has compound foliage. In summer, especially late summer, it bears yellow flowers developing into long, flat, dark brown pods. Flowers are visited by carpenter bees, and bumblebees. Sulphur butterflies use the plant as a larval food source.

The species is named after F. A. Wislizenus, a botanist who studied Mexican flora in the mid-19th century. Some sources mistakenly spell the epithet "wislizenii." Correct spelling is with one "i," per ICN article 60C.2.

There are several named varieties:

- var. painteri (Britton & Rose) H.S.Irwin & Barneby (= Cassia wislizenii A. Gray var. painteri (Britton & Rose) H.S.Irwin & Barneby, Palmerocassia painteri Britton & Rose)
- var. pringlei (Rose) H.S.Irwin & Barneby (= Cassia morelensis Greenm., Cassia pringlei Rose, Palmerocassia pringlei (Rose) Britton & Rose)
- var. villosa (Britton & Rose) H.S.Irwin & Barneby (= Cassia wislizenii A. Gray var. villosa (Britton & Rose) H.S.Irwin & Barneby, Palmerocassia villosa Britton & Rose)
