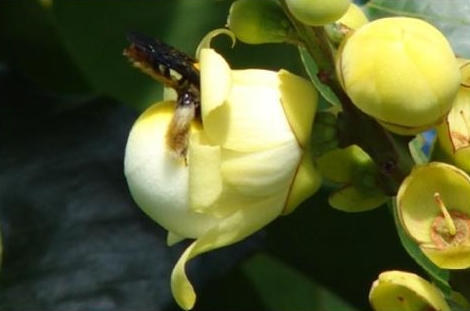

Scientific classification
- Domain: Eukaryota
- Kingdom: Animalia
- Phylum: Arthropoda
- Class: Insecta
- Order: Hymenoptera
- Family: Apidae
- Tribe: Centridini
- Genus: Epicharis; Klug, 1807

Subgenera and species
- <40 species in 9 subgenera

Synonyms
- Eucharis Dalla Torre, 1896 (non Eucharis Latreille, 1804: lapsus)

= Epicharis (bee) =

Genus of bees

The genus Epicharis contains fewer than 40 species of large apid bees occurring in the Neotropics (from Mexico to Brazil), most of which possess adaptations for carrying floral oils rather than (or in addition to) pollen or nectar. The floral oils are typically gathered from plants of the family Malpighiaceae, though other plants may be visited. They also commonly gather plant resins for use in nest cell construction. Recent studies have shown they are sister to the clade formed by corbiculate bees (the most well-known and economically important group of bees) plus Centris They are large bees, generally with a black head and mesosoma, and the metasoma is often red, and/or has bright yellow spots or bands. They are distinguished from the closely related genus Centris by two sets of three long, whip-like setae that project backwards from just behind the eyes.
