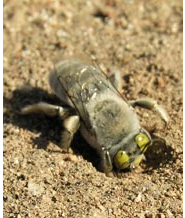
- Digging male

Scientific classification
- Kingdom: Animalia
- Phylum: Arthropoda
- Clade: Pancrustacea
- Class: Insecta
- Order: Hymenoptera
- Family: Apidae
- Genus: Centris
- Species: C. pallida

Binomial name
- Centris pallida Fox, 1899
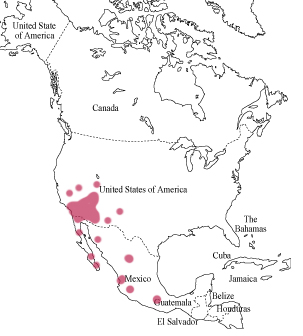
- Distribution map

= Centris pallida =

Species of bee

Centris pallida is a species of solitary bee native to North America. It lacks an accepted common name; however, it has been called the digger bee, the desert bee, and the pallid bee due to its actions, habitat, and color respectively. The solitary nature of this bee allows for a dual-strategy mating system which produces an evolutionarily stable state resistant to invading strategies. These bees have also evolved to withstand the high temperatures of their native habitat. C. pallida routinely has internal temperatures within 3 degrees Celsius of death.

== Taxonomy and phylogenetics ==
Centris pallida was officially discovered and catalogued by William J. Fox in 1899 near Phoenix, Arizona. Fox also discovered Centris cockerelli, Centris errans, and Sphex subhyalinus. This species is closely related to Centris cockerelli in terms of habitat and genus, but is different in terms of mating, color, and subgenus. This bee also belongs to the superfamily Apoidea, and the subfamily Apinae.

== Description and identification ==
This bee is black and densely covered in a grey pubescence or fur on the dorsal side. The thorax fur has a slightly yellow color. The legs have a mixture of black and reddish fur. The ventral side of the bee is covered in a brownish or dark yellow fur. The wings are fairly transparent except for the black veins that run through them. Males and females are similar in size at about 16–17 millimeters. Males have eyes more yellow in color, and their thorax fur is lighter. Females have eyes more green in color, and their thorax fur is more brown than grey.

== Distribution and habitat ==
Centris pallida are located in dry, hot environments of North America. Specifically, they are in Arizona, Nevada, southern California, New Mexico, and western Mexico. They are a very common bee (especially in Arizona), and are thus classified as Least Concern in terms of conservation. The fur and dark colored exoskeleton allow the bees to survive the cold nights in the desert. During the daytime, C. pallida are almost completely inactive, hiding in shade or in burrows to prevent overheating.

== Life cycle ==
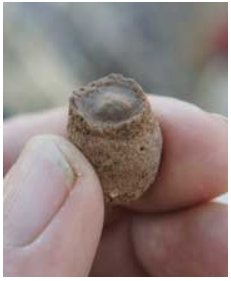
Centris pallida brood pot

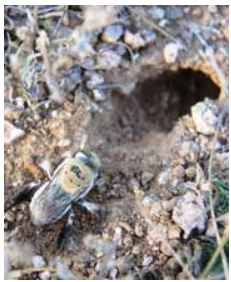
Centris pallida digging female

=== Making chambers ===
A C. pallida female will find a spot for her nest. She will then dig diagonally down about 12 inches (30 cm). At the end of this tunnel, she will dig a 1 inch (2.5 cm) long vertical chamber where the egg will be laid. The chamber will be about 8 inches (20 cm) below the surface. In this chamber, the female will form a brood pot lined with wax. The brood pot will contain nectar and pollen similar to the bee bread in other bees; however, unlike other bees, the bee bread is the consistency of molasses instead of being solid. The egg is laid on top of the bee bread and sealed in with wax, and the tunnel is partially filled with dirt to protect the egg. A female can create several of the burrows during her lifetime.

=== After hatching ===
The egg will then hatch within two weeks, and the larva will eat the nourishment that the mother left. The amount of bee bread provided will directly affect the size of the offspring (more food = larger size). When the food has been eaten and the larva has fully developed, the larva will turn into a prepupa. Over the course of eleven months, the prepupa will undergo metamorphosis to become an adult bee. The adult bee will then dig to the surface in late April or early May, and will live for about a month. By late July, virtually no C. pallida can be found.

== Diet ==
Centris pallida typically feed on flowers that can withstand the hot temperatures of its habitat. These plants include palo verde (Cercidium microphyllum and Cercidium floridium), ironwood (Olnyea tesota), and creosote bush (Larrea divaricata). The palo verde pollen is the most common, and it gives the bee bread a strong orange color. Due to the large expenditure of energy by males during hovering and/or patrolling, they must consume about 3.5 times their body weight in nectar each day.

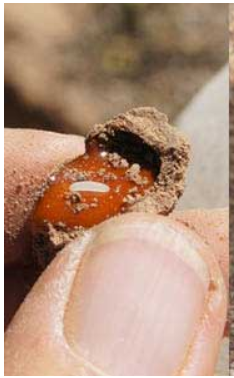
Palo verde and larva in brood pot

== Behavior ==
=== Mating behavior ===
The two categories of behavior for C. pallida males are patrolling and hovering. These strategies are also used to find mates. In one category (the patrollers), male bees will patrol 3–6 centimeters above the ground in search of sites where buried virgin females will emerge. When a male bee finds such a site, he will dig 1–2 centimeters through the soil by gnawing at the surface with his jaws and using his forelegs to remove dirt from the excavation. If a female is found, he will attempt to mate with her either on the surface or at a nearby flower or tree. Other patrollers will sometimes attempt to steal a digging spot that another bee has found. If a bee has already found a female, another patroller bee may separate the male from the female so that it can copulate with the virgin. More often than not, the female (once found) will mate with either the male that found her or with an intruder.

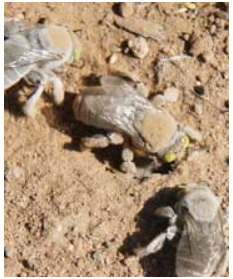
Centris pallida males looking for females

The other category of behavior (the hoverers) uses a very different strategy that relies on the inherent limitations of the patroller strategy. Females won't have copulated with a patroller if they weren't found before emerging, or if they departed while the male that found them was fighting off a rival. The hoverers will wait either near plants that are close to emergence areas, regardless of whether the plants are flowering, or at flowering trees and shrubs well away from the emergence areas. These bees will hover anywhere from a few centimeters to eight meters in the air. Since patrollers are generally looking at the ground to find emergence areas, hoverers have less competition over escaped females. Those that are close to the emergence areas are able to quickly spot any females that got away from the patrollers. Male bees that are away from emergence areas stake out flowering plants in the hope that virgin females will arrive seeking food. Also, low-emergence areas are less likely to be patrolled, and thus, more females emerge without copulating.

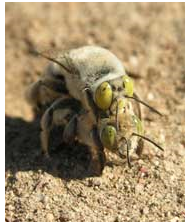
Male on top of a female.

==== Pheromones ====
Male C. pallida are able to detect the pheromones females release and use those to locate female burrows. Right before emerging from her burrow, a virgin female will release a scent that wafts up through the soil and is recognised by the males with their antennas. This has led to males developing a very acute olfactory sense. Freshly-killed females have been buried to test whether sound also plays a part in male signaling. In these tests, male bees still dug up the dead females, proving that pheromone signaling is the only pathway. Males have also been observed to dig up other males. This shows that males and virgin females give off similar pheromones. Oddly, males also sometimes dig up other digger bee species. It is currently unknown why this occurs.

=== Patrolling behavior ===
There is a size correlation which determines whether males become patrollers or hoverers. Patrollers tend to be larger so that they can better protect and copulate with emerging females. Smaller males are usually unable to compete as well, and so have to make the best out of a bad situation; thus, they become hoverers. Each group has a different set of behaviors. The patrollers move over a large space containing many other patrollers. Usually, patrollers will frequent the same spots over the course of their lives. Since the area is so large, the cost to defend it against other patrollers would be much greater than the potential mating benefits, so the patrollers show very little territoriality. Patroller males will usually only fight when a breeding female is near. In contrast, each hoverer stakes out an area of about one meter in diameter. These areas don’t overlap with other hoverers. Any fast moving object (i.e. bee, dragonfly, leaf, etc.) that enters a territory will be quickly chased. The chase allows the male bee to determine if a female is unmated, or if an enemy male is in his territory. If it is a male bee, the territory owner will chase it out, but not beyond the boundary of the territory. What is interesting is that every day (or even every several hours) the territory holder will abandon the area to establish a new zone. Often the male will never return to the vacated area, and it will be taken over by another male. This shows that hoverers show a low site tendency but strong territoriality. A balanced ratio of patrollers to hoverers is maintained, and thus, this ratio is an evolutionary stable strategy. If more males become patrollers, then the hoverers will benefit from the reduced competition, and the hoverers' genes will spread until the stable ratio is returned to. The same thing will happen if more males become hoverers.

=== Female provisioning behavior ===
Larger females are able to better control the size of their offspring. As stated in the Life cycle section, more bee bread leads to larger offspring. Larger females are able to gather more pollen and nectar in a shorter amount of time when compared to smaller females. This means that during rich conditions, the larger females can have larger offspring with greater fitness, or if conditions are poor, the females can simply choose to have smaller offspring. There is a lower limit to how small offspring can be, and thus, smaller females can’t make this reduction or increase in size in response to the environment. Smaller females are still able to exist since larger females can’t take advantage of having larger offspring when the density of nesting grounds is low. To put it another way, larger male offspring are less effective in low density nesting grounds since they don’t have as many opportunities to use their size to fight off other males; thus, in low density nesting grounds, small and large males have similar fitness which means that the extra bee bread which the larger male received served no purpose. Smaller males actually do better in low density areas because they don’t have to fight with larger males as much, and by extension, expend less energy. This lack of a reason to produce larger offspring reduces the fitness of the larger females since they have to dig larger tunnels to fit in, but still produce the same size offspring as smaller females.

== Inter-species interactions ==
=== Environmental mortality ===
Desert birds and lizards are predators of C. pallida, and these bees can be parasitized by the meloid beetle (Tegrodera erosa); however, rain is the largest threat to these bees. At night and during the heat of the day, C. pallida bees will hide under rocks, trees, in burrows, etc. When it rains, the bees can get wet. If the bee is in a burrow, it may simply drown. If the bee is underneath something, when night comes, the bee may freeze to death due to the low temperatures in the desert. Since these bees are solitary, they don’t have the protection of a hive or colony; thus, they are more susceptible to the elements.

=== Bacteria ===
Four varieties of bacteria have been found in the bee bread of the larva: Bacillus circulans, B. coagulans, B. firmus, and B. megaterium. Only the Bacillus genus has been found in the samples taken. Together, these four species were able to hydrolyze starch, ferment glucose, convert nitrates to nitrites, and produce dihydroxyacetone from glycerol. This group of bacteria also lowers the pH of the bee bread. These functions serve not only to protect the larva from other bacteria, but they also digest complex molecules which allow the larva to easily absorb nutrients without expending a lot of energy. The bacteria, in turn, receive a supply of food which results in a mutualistic relationship.

== Temperature regulation ==
Centris pallida are able to withstand very high internal temperatures when compared to other bees. Males regularly have thoracic temperatures of 48 to 49 degrees Celsius (118.4 to 120.2 degrees Fahrenheit). If the thoracic temperature reaches 51 to 52 degrees Celsius (123.8 to 125.6 degrees Fahrenheit), the bee will become paralyzed and die. Most of the cooling occurs when heat radiates off the abdomen. To prevent overheating, C. pallida have a very high thoracic conductance (rate of heat transfer from the thorax to the abdomen) which is 45 percent higher than that of sphinx moths of the same size. Other than this high thoracic conductance, no other mechanism has been found to help the bee reduce its internal temperature. C. pallida do not appear to have evaporative cooling in the wild as honey bees and bumblebees do.

== Human importance ==
Centris pallida serve numerous roles for the environment. Like most other bees, they are essential for pollination. Specifically, they pollinate cacti, desert willow, and palo verde. The tunneling ability of these bees aerates the soil, and this allows water from rain to reach plant roots quickly. Their nitrogen rich feces fertilizes the soil. Their stings are mild, so they are not dangerous. The only downside with respect to humans is that their burrowing can leave unsightly mounds. If an area has a large density of burrowing females, then these mounds can be quite noticeable and are difficult to get rid of.
