= Centris cockerelli =

Scientific classification
- Domain: Eukaryota
- Kingdom: Animalia
- Phylum: Arthropoda
- Class: Insecta
- Order: Hymenoptera
- Family: Apidae
- Genus: Centris
- Species: C. cockerelli

Binomial name
- Centris cockerelli Fox, 1899

Species of bee

Centris cockerelli is a species in the family Apidae ("cuckoo, carpenter, digger, bumble, and honey bees"), in the order Hymenoptera ("ants, bees, wasps and sawflies"). The distribution range of Centris cockerelli includes Central America and North America.
