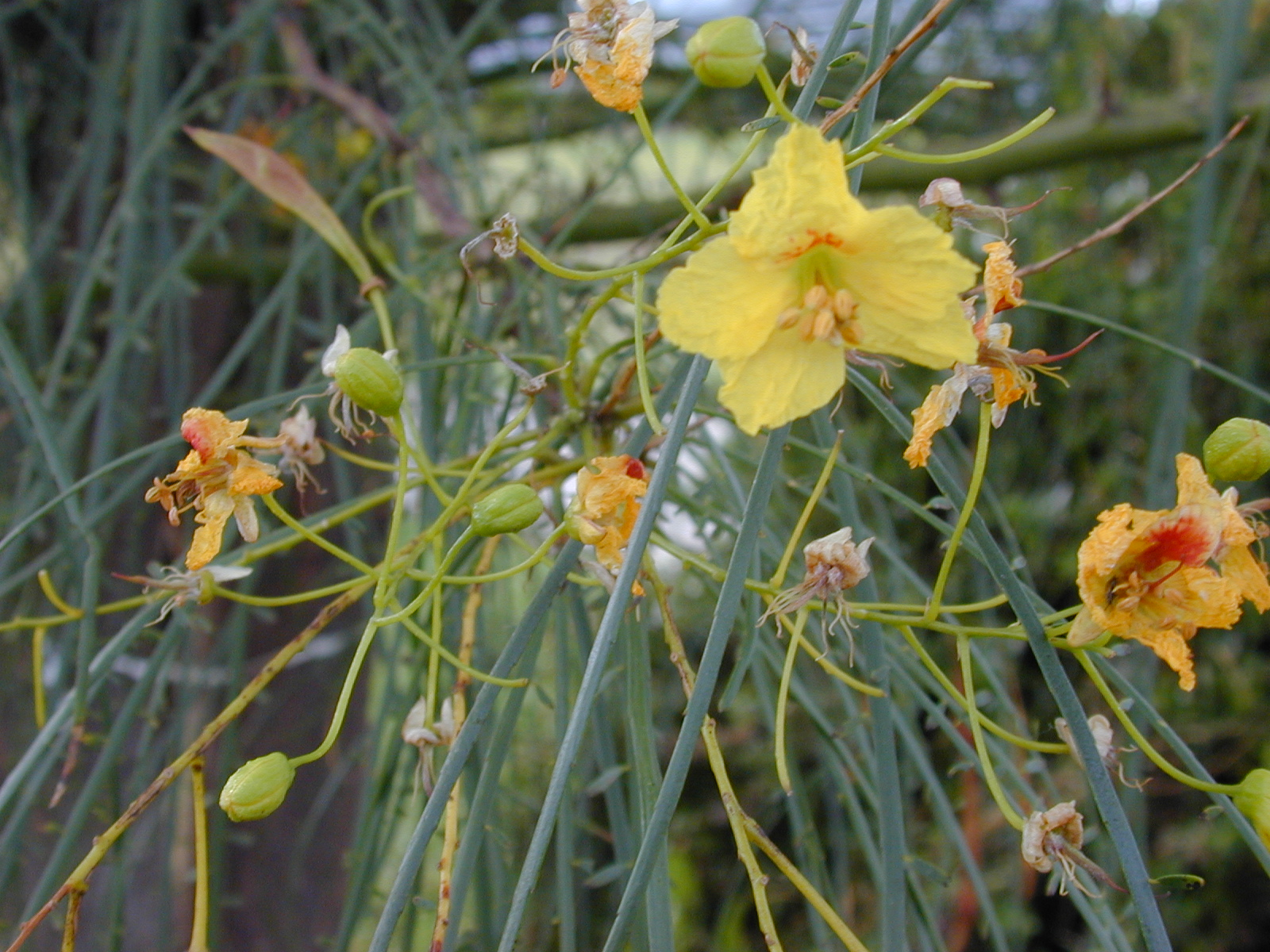
- Flowers and leaves of Parkinsonia aculeata

Scientific classification
- Kingdom: Plantae
- Clade: Embryophytes
- Clade: Tracheophytes
- Clade: Spermatophytes
- Clade: Angiosperms
- Clade: Eudicots
- Clade: Rosids
- Order: Fabales
- Family: Fabaceae
- Subfamily: Caesalpinioideae
- Genus: Parkinsonia; L.

Type species
- Parkinsonia aculeata L.

Species
- See text

Synonyms
- Cercidiopsis Britton & Rose; Cercidium Tul. Peltophoropsis Chiov. Rhetinophloeum H.Karst.

= Parkinsonia =

Genus of legumes

Parkinsonia /ˌpɑːrkɪnˈsoʊniə/, also Cercidium /sərˈsɪdiəm/, is a genus of flowering plants in the pea family, Fabaceae. It contains about 12 species that are native to semidesert regions of Africa and the Americas. The name of the genus honors English apothecary and botanist John Parkinson (1567–1650).

They are large shrubs or small trees growing to 5–12 m (16–39 ft) tall, dry season deciduous, with sparse, open, thorny crowns and green bark. The leaves are pinnate, usually bipinnate, with numerous small leaflets; they are only borne for a relatively short time after rains, with much of the photosynthesis carried out by the green twigs and branches. The flowers are symmetrical or nearly so, with five yellow or white petals. The fruit is a pod containing several seeds.

Most American species are known by the common name of palo verde or paloverde, derived from the Spanish words meaning "green tree". This name is given due to its characteristic green trunk. The palo verde (not species-specific) is the state tree of Arizona.

== Ecology ==
A major pollinator for Parkinsonia species in the southwestern United States and western Mexico is Centris pallida, a solitary bee known as the digger or pallid bee. C. pallida obtains nectar and pollen from this plant to fill a brood pot so that their larvae will have food when they hatch. The nectar and pollen give its bee bread a strong orange color.

== Selected species ==
- Parkinsonia aculeata L. – Mexican palo verde (Sonoran and Chihuahuan deserts of the United States and Mexico and southward to Argentina; Galápagos Islands)
- Parkinsonia africana Sond. (Botswana, Namibia, South Africa)
- Parkinsonia anacantha Brenan (Kenya)
- Parkinsonia andicola (Griseb.) S.Watson (syn. Cercidium andicola)
- Parkinsonia carterae (western Mexico south to Ecuador)
- Parkinsonia florida (Benth. ex A.Gray) S.Watson (syn. Cercidium floridum) – blue palo verde (Southern California, Arizona, northwestern Mexico)
- Parkinsonia microphylla Torr. (syn. Cercidium microphyllum) – foothill palo verde (Southern California, Arizona, northwestern Mexico)
- Parkinsonia praecox (Ruiz & Pav.) J.A.Hawkins (syn. Cercidium praecox) – brea, verde olivo (northwest Mexico and South America - south to Argentina)
- Parkinsonia raimondoi Brenan (Somalia)
- Parkinsonia scioana (Chiov.) Brenan (Djibouti, Ethiopia, Somalia, Kenya)
- Parkinsonia texana (A.Gray) S.Watson (syn. Cercidium texanum) – Texas palo verde (Texas, northeastern Mexico)
  - Parkinsonia texana var. macra (I.M.Johnst.) Isely
  - Parkinsonia texana var. texana
