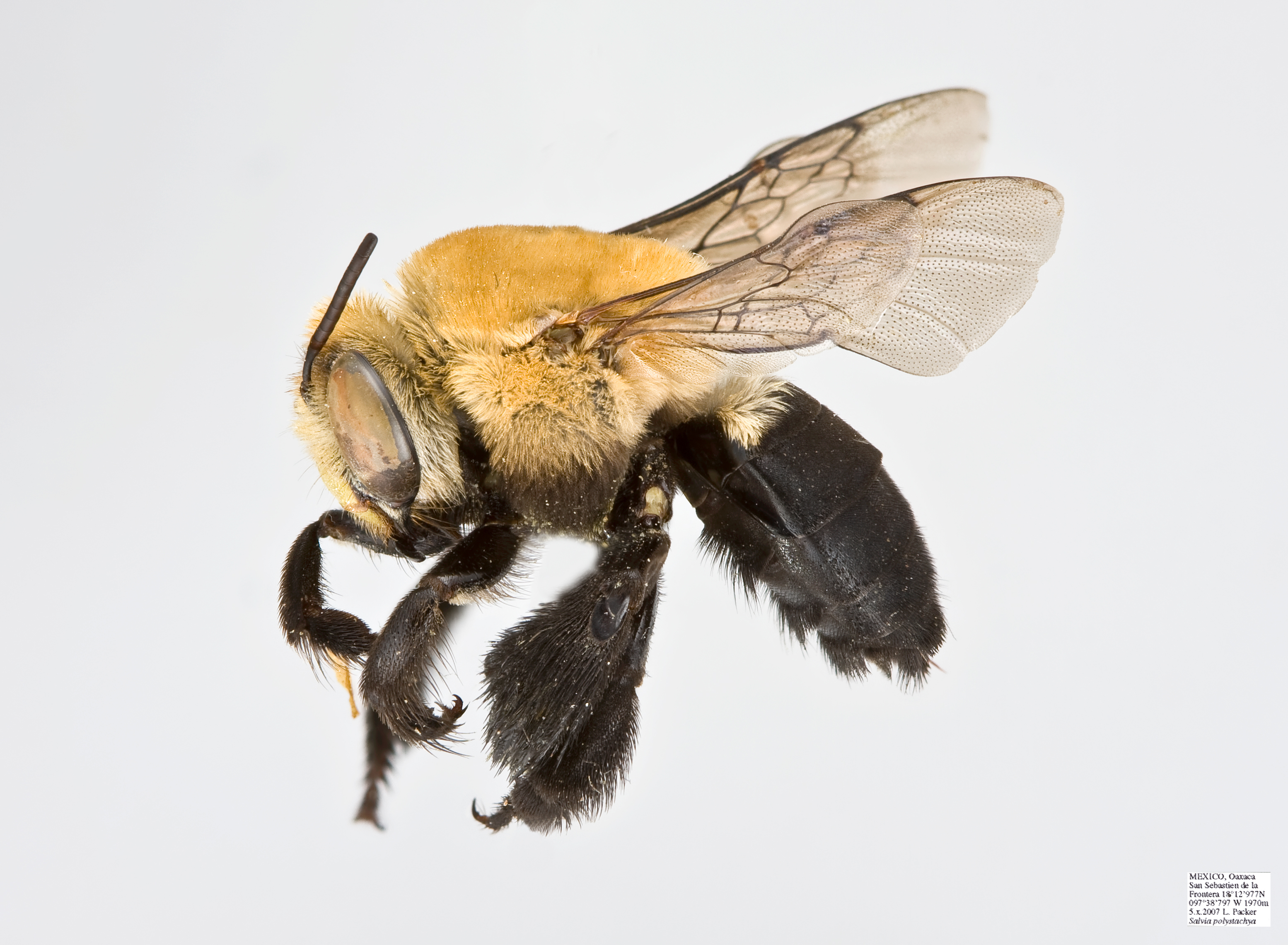
- Centris nitida

Scientific classification
- Kingdom: Animalia
- Phylum: Arthropoda
- Class: Insecta
- Order: Hymenoptera
- Family: Apidae
- Tribe: Centridini
- Genus: Centris

Diversity
- > 110 species in 12 subgenera

= Centris =

Genus of bees

The genus Centris contains circa 250 species of large apid bees occurring in the Neotropical and Nearctic realms, from Kansas to Argentina. Most females of these bees possess adaptations for carrying floral oils rather than (or in addition to) pollen or nectar. They mainly visit plants of the family Malpighiaceae to collect oil, but also visit others such as Plantaginaceae, Calceolariaceae, and Krameriaceae. Recent studies have shown they are sister to the corbiculate bees, the most well-known and economically important group of bees.

They are large (up to 3 cm), fast-flying bees, distinguished from the closely related genus Epicharis by the absence of long, whip-like setae that project backwards from just behind the eyes. They are commonly encountered bees in American deserts, and are active at very high ambient temperatures when many other species are in hiding. They can often be seen in large numbers on desert-willow (Chilopsis) and palo verde (Parkinsonia) blossoms. Bees of this genus are of some economical significance in pollinating crops such as Brazil nuts (Bertholletia excelsa) and cashews (Anacardium occidentale, pollinated by C. tarsata among others).

The mating system of one species, C. pallida, has been particularly well-researched by the behavioral ecologist John Alcock; the entomologist Adolpho Ducke also studied this genus.

== Selected species ==
- Centris cockerelli
- Centris errans
- Centris pallida
- Centris tarsata

== See also ==
- List of Centris species
