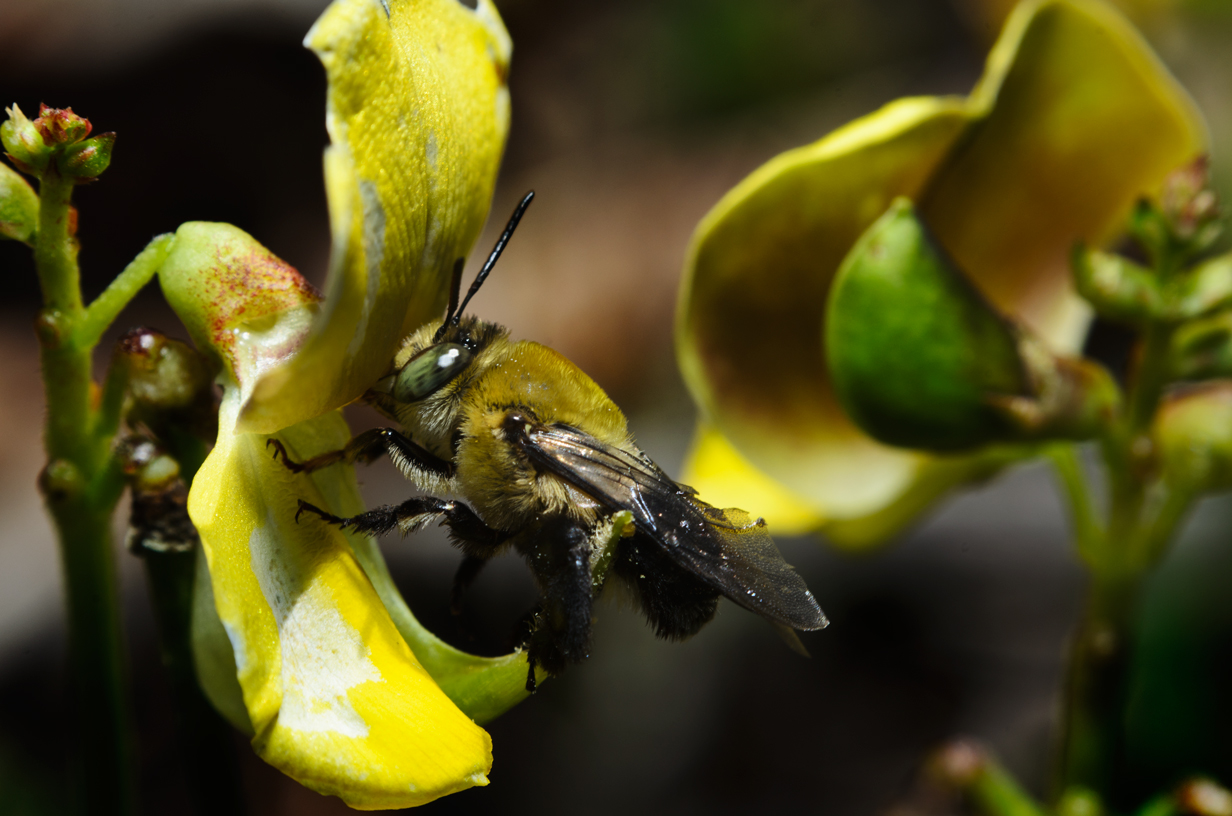

Scientific classification
- Kingdom: Animalia
- Phylum: Arthropoda
- Clade: Pancrustacea
- Class: Insecta
- Order: Hymenoptera
- Family: Apidae
- Subfamily: Apinae
- Tribe: Centridini

Genera
- Centris; Epicharis

= Centridini =

Tribe of bees

The Centridini are a tribe of large apid bees, many of which possess adaptations for carrying floral oils rather than (or in addition to) pollen or nectar. The floral oils are often gathered from plants of the family Malpighiaceae, though other plants may be visited. The oil-collecting species typically have "combs" composed of closely spaced, flattened, blunt bristles on the margins of the first tarsal segments of the front and middle legs; others may have velvety "pads" to absorb the oils. They also commonly gather plant resins for use in nest cell construction. They have a tiny pterostigma in the forewing, the female scopa is very bushy, and the first flagellomere of the antenna is often longer than the scape.

Centris are commonly encountered bees in American deserts, and are active at very high ambient temperatures when many other species are in hiding. They can often be seen in large numbers on palo verde blossoms. A common example in Arizona is Centris pallida.
