= Glycerol monostearate =

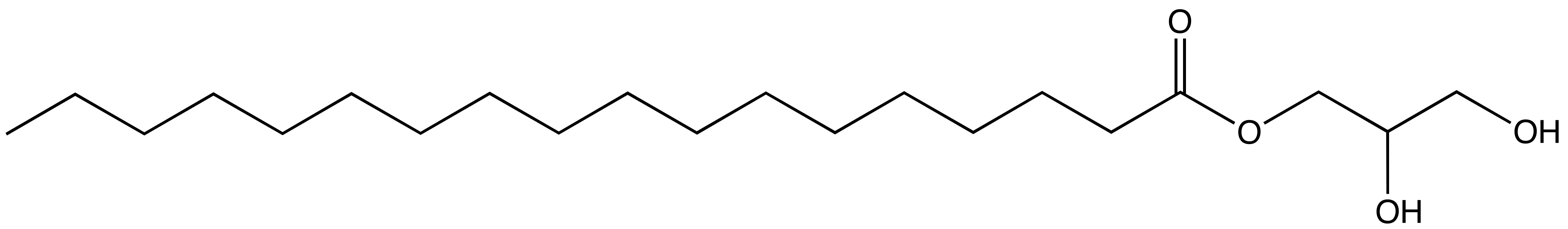
- 1-glycerol monostearate (1-isomer)

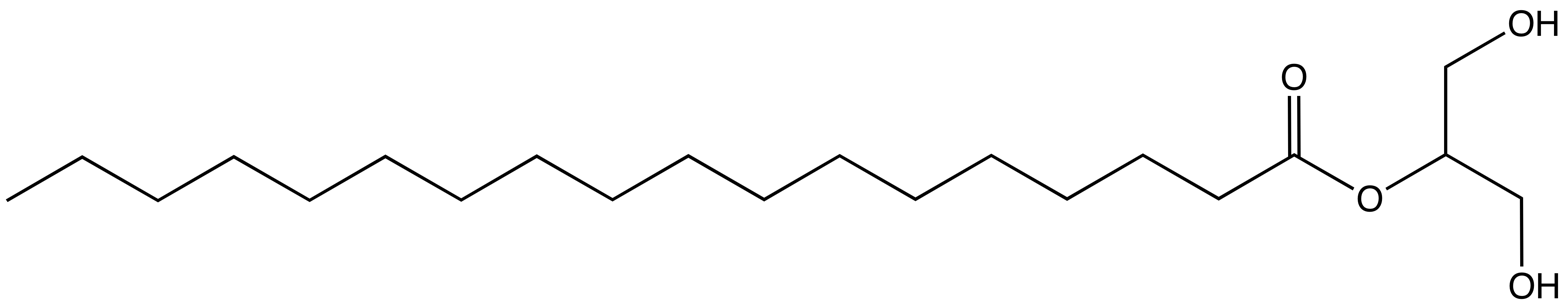
- 2-glycerol monostearate (2-isomer)

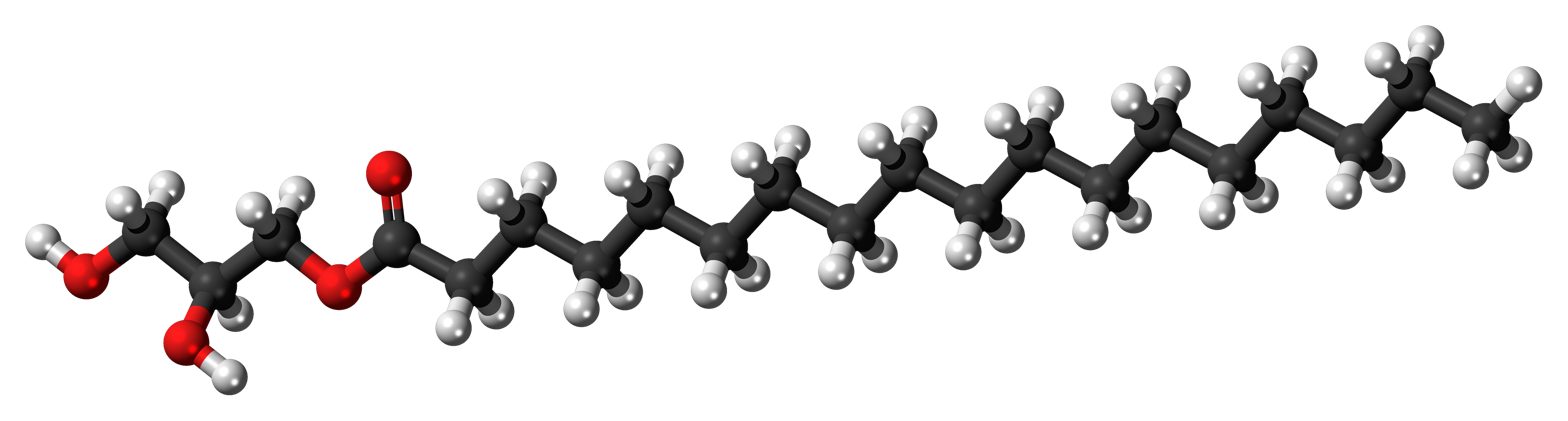
- 3D model (1-isomer)

Names
- IUPAC name 2,3-Dihydroxypropyl octadecanoate
- Other names Glyceryl monostearate Glycerin monostearate Monostearin; GMS

Identifiers
- Compounds; (Mix): Mixture of 1- and 2- isomers; (1-): 1-glycerol monostearate; (2-): 2-glycerol monostearate
CAS Number	(Mix): 31566-31-1; (1-): 123-94-4; (2-): 621-61-4
3D model (JSmol)	(Mix): Interactive image
Abbreviations	GMS
ChEMBL	(Mix): ChEMBL255696
ChemSpider	(Mix): 23095
ECHA InfoCard	100.046.081
KEGG	(Mix): D01947
PubChem CID	(1-): 24699; (2-): 79075
UNII	(Mix): 258491E1RZ
CompTox Dashboard (EPA)	(Mix): DTXSID7027968
- InChI: (Mix): InChI=1/C21H42O4/c1-2-3-4-5-6-7-8-9-10-11-12-13-14-15-16-17-21(24)25-19-20(23)18-22/h20,22-23H,2-19H2,1H3 Key: VBICKXHEKHSIBG-UHFFFAOYAT; (1-): InChI=1S/C21H42O4/c1-2-3-4-5-6-7-8-9-10-11-12-13-14-15-16-17-21(24)25-19-20(23)18-22/h20,22-23H,2-19H2,1H3 Key: VBICKXHEKHSIBG-UHFFFAOYSA-N
- SMILES: (Mix): O=C(OCC(O)CO)CCCCCCCCCCCCCCCCC

Properties
Chemical formula	C_{21}H_{42}O_{4}
Molar mass	358.563 g·mol^{−1}
Appearance	White solid
Density	1.03 g/cm^{3}
Melting point	(Mix) 57–65 °C (135–149 °F) (1-) 81 °C (178 °F) (2-) 73–74 °C (163–165 °F)
Solubility in water	Insoluble

Hazards
NFPA 704 (fire diamond)	0 1 0
Flash point	230 °C (446 °F) (open cup)
- Except where otherwise noted, data are given for materials in their standard state (at 25 °C [77 °F], 100 kPa). verify (what is ?) Infobox references

Glycerol monostearate, commonly known as GMS, is a monoglyceride commonly used as an emulsifier in foods. It takes the form of a white, odorless, and sweet-tasting flaky powder that is hygroscopic. Chemically it is the glycerol ester of stearic acid. It is also used as hydration powder in exercise formulas.

== Structure, synthesis, and occurrence ==
Glycerol monostearate exists as three stereoisomers, 2-glycerol monostearate and the enantiomeric pair of 1-glycerol monostearate. Typically these are encountered as a mixture as many of their properties are similar.

Commercial material used in foods is produced industrially by a glycerolysis reaction between triglycerides (from either vegetable or animal fats) and glycerol.

Glycerol monostearate occurs naturally in the body as a product of the breakdown of fats by pancreatic lipase. It is present at very low levels in certain seed oils.

== Uses ==
GMS is a food additive used as a thickening, emulsifying, anticaking, and preservative agent; an emulsifying agent for oils, waxes, and solvents; a protective coating for hygroscopic powders; a solidifier and control release agent in pharmaceuticals; and a resin lubricant. It is also used in cosmetics and hair-care products.

GMS is largely used in baking preparations to add "body" to the food. It is somewhat responsible for giving ice cream and whipped cream their smooth texture. It is sometimes used as an antistaling agent in bread.

It can also be used as an additive in plastic, where GMS works as an antistatic and antifogging agent. This is common in food packaging.

== See also ==
- Glyceryl hydroxystearate
- Monolaurin

== Compendial status ==
- British Pharmacopoeia
