= MOGAT2 =

Protein-coding gene in the species Homo sapiens

Identifiers
- Aliases: MOGAT2, DGAT2L5, MGAT2, DGAT2L5., hDC5, monoacylglycerol O-acyltransferase 2
- External IDs: OMIM: 610270; MGI: 2663253; GeneCards: MOGAT2
Enzyme activity
EC #	BRENDA	ExPASy	KEGG	MetaCyc
2.3.1.20	↗	↗	↗	↗
2.3.1.22	↗	↗	↗	↗

Gene location (Human)
Chr.	Chromosome 11 (human)
Band	11q13.5	Start	75,717,838 bp
Band	11q13.5	End	75,732,958 bp

Gene location (Mouse)
Chr.	Chromosome 7 (mouse)
Band	7|7 E1	Start	98,868,291 bp
Band	7|7 E1	End	98,887,826 bp
RNA expression pattern
Bgee	Human / Mouse (ortholog); Top expressed in: mucosa of ileum; mucosa of transverse colon; right lobe of liver; testicle; rectum; jejunal mucosa; duodenum; mucosa of sigmoid colon; epithelium of colon; appendix / Top expressed in: epithelium of small intestine; intestinal villus; ileum; jejunum; yolk sac; duodenum; primitive streak; migratory enteric neural crest cell; epiblast; somite; More reference expression data
BioGPS	n/a
Gene ontology
Molecular function	transferase activity; acetyltransferase activity; acyltransferase activity; acyltransferase activity, transferring groups other than amino-acyl groups; 2-acylglycerol O-acyltransferase activity
Cellular component	integral component of membrane; endoplasmic reticulum; membrane; endoplasmic reticulum membrane
Biological process	intestinal absorption; glycerol metabolic process; diacylglycerol biosynthetic process; lipid metabolism; triglyceride biosynthetic process
Sources:Amigo / QuickGO
Orthologs
Databases	NCBI: entry; OMA: entry
Species	Human	Mouse
Entrez	80168	233549
Ensembl	ENSG00000166391	ENSMUSG00000052396
UniProt	Q3SYC2	Q80W94
RefSeq (mRNA)	NM_025098	NM_177448
RefSeq (protein)	NP_079374	NP_803231
Location (UCSC)	Chr 11: 75.72 – 75.73 Mb	Chr 7: 98.87 – 98.89 Mb
PubMed search
- Wikidata
View/Edit Human	View/Edit Mouse

2-Acylglycerol O-acyltransferase 2 also known as acyl-CoA:monoacylglycerol acyltransferase 2 (MGAT2) or Diacylglycerol O-acyltransferase candidate 5 (DC5) is an enzyme that in humans is encoded by the MOGAT2 gene.

MOGAT2 and the related MOGAT3 genes are members of the acylglycerol o-acyltransferase family (DGAT2/MOGAT) and are involved in the synthesis of diacylglycerol (DAG) and triacylglycerol (TAG) from monoacylglycerol (MAG).

MOGAT2 and also MOGAT3 are single copy genes in almost all mammals. However, in ruminants both genes have undergone tandem gene expansion, indicative of evolving functionality. MOGAT2 has more than five tandemly duplicated copies in sheep with the first copy expressed in the duodenum and the last copy expressed in the skin, with no expression of any copy detected in the liver.
