= Thomas F. J. Martin =

American biochemist and cell biologist

- Education: Cornell University (A.B.); Harvard University (Ph.D.)
- Known for: Discovery and characterization of CAPS (Calcium-dependent Activator Protein for Secretion / CADPS) proteins Vesicle priming in regulated exocytosis
- Awards: Wasson Professorship in Biochemistry; Earl W. Sutherland Professorship in Biochemistry; NIH MERIT Award; McKnight Neuroscience Investigator Award
- Scientific career
- Workplaces: University of Wisconsin–Madison

Thomas F. J. Martin is an American biochemist and cell biologist. He is best known for his discovery and characterization of the CAPS (Calcium-dependent Activator Protein for Secretion, also known as CADPS) family of proteins, which serve as essential priming factors in regulated exocytosis-the calcium-triggered release of hormones and neurotransmitters from dense-core vesicles in neuroendocrine and neural cells.

He is Professor Emeritus in the Department of Biochemistry at the University of Wisconsin–Madison, where he held two named professorships and conducted research that helped elucidate the molecular machinery of vesicle priming and SNARE-mediated membrane fusion.

== Early life and education ==
Martin received his A.B. degree from Cornell University and his Ph.D. from Harvard University.

== Career ==
Martin joined the University of Wisconsin–Madison faculty in 1978 as Assistant Professor in Zoology and became Professor of Biochemistry in 1994. He held the Wasson Professorship in Biochemistry and the Earl W. Sutherland Professorship in Biochemistry. He became Professor Emeritus in 2022.

== Research ==
Martin's laboratory investigated signal transduction mechanisms for peptide hormones that contributed to finding that receptor-regulated hydrolysis of the inositol phospholipid PI(4,5)P_{2} was central to hormone signaling. His later work on intracellular signaling again revealed the importance of inositol phospholipids as well as some of the protein machinery underlying Ca^{2+}-triggered exocytosis in neuroendocrine and neural cells. In 1992, working with colleagues, he identified a novel 145 kDa cytosolic protein-later named CAPS-that reconstitutes calcium-regulated secretion in permeable neuroendocrine cells.

Work in his lab in 1995 also discovered that the phosphoinositide PI(4,5)P_{2} was essential for regulated vesicle exocytosis. Subsequent work established CAPS as a PI(4,5)P_{2}-binding protein that acts at a pre-fusion step to promote assembly of SNARE complexes and vesicle priming.

His group further demonstrated that CAPS (and its paralog Munc13) functions as a "CATCHR" protein that drives trans-SNARE complex formation through direct syntaxin interactions, and that CAPS is required for dense-core vesicle exocytosis in genetic models such as Caenorhabditis elegans and Drosophila melanogaster. This body of work, along with later reviews by Martin and colleagues, has clarified how PI(4,5)P_{2}-binding effectors coordinate multiple stages of vesicle exocytosis and has informed research on secretion defects in neurological and endocrine disorders.

== Awards and honors ==
- Wasson Professorship in Biochemistry
- Earl W. Sutherland Professorship in Biochemistry
- NIH MERIT Award, for long-term studies on stages of regulated exocytosis
- McKnight Neuroscience Investigator Award, for research on the molecular mechanisms of neurosecretion

== Selected publications ==
- Martin, Thomas F.; Kowalchyk, Judith A. (1983). "Thyrotropin-releasing hormone rapidly activates the phosphodiester hydrolysis of polyphosphoinositides in GH_{3} pituitary cells. Evidence for the role of a polyphosphoinositide-specific phospholipase C in hormone action". Journal of Biological Chemistry. 258 (24): 14816–14822. doi:10.1016/S0021-9258(17)43734-3. PMID 6317674.
- Walent, J. H.; Porter, B. W.; Martin, T. F. J. (1992). "A novel 145 kDa brain cytosolic protein reconstitutes Ca^{2+}-regulated secretion in permeable neuroendocrine cells". Cell. 70 (5): 765–775. doi:10.1016/0092-8674(92)90310-9. PMID 1516133.
- Hay, J. C.; Fisette, P. L.; Jenkins, G. H.; Fukami, K.; Takenawa, T.; Anderson, R. A.; Martin, T. F. (1995). "ATP-dependent inositide phosphorylation required for Ca^{2+}-activated secretion". Nature. 374 (6518): 173–177. Bibcode:1995Natur.374..173H. doi:10.1038/374173a0. PMID 7877690.
- Loyet, K. M.; Kowalchyk, J. A.; Chaudhary, A.; Chen, J.; Prestwich, G. D.; Martin, T. F. (1998). "Specific binding of phosphatidylinositol 4,5-bisphosphate to calcium-dependent activator protein for secretion (CAPS), a potential phosphoinositide effector protein for regulated exocytosis". Journal of Biological Chemistry. 273 (14): 8337–8343. doi:10.1074/jbc.273.14.8337. PMID 9525942.
- Renden, R.; Berwin, B.; Davis, W.; Ann, K.; Chin, C. T.; Kreber, R.; Ganetzky, B.; Martin, T. F.; Broadie, K. (2001). "Drosophila CAPS is an essential gene that regulates dense-core vesicle release and synaptic vesicle fusion". Neuron. 31 (3): 421–437. doi:10.1016/s0896-6273(01)00382-8. PMID 11516399.
- Grishanin, R. N.; Kowalchyk, J. A.; Klenchin, V. A.; Ann, K.; Earles, C. A.; Chapman, E. R.; Gerona, R. R.; Martin, T. F. J. (2004). "CAPS Acts at a Prefusion Step in Dense-Core Vesicle Exocytosis as a PIP_{2} Binding Protein". Neuron. 43 (4): 551–562. doi:10.1016/j.neuron.2004.07.028. PMID 15312653.
- Speese, Sean D.; Petrie, Matt; Schuske, Kim; Ailion, Michael; Ann, Kyoungsook; Iwasaki, Kouichi; Jorgensen, Erik M.; Martin, Thomas F. J. (2007). "UNC-31 (CAPS) Is Required for Dense-Core Vesicle But Not Synaptic Vesicle Exocytosis in Caenorhabditis elegans". Journal of Neuroscience. 27 (23): 6150–6162. doi:10.1523/JNEUROSCI.1466-07.2007. PMC 6672160. PMID 17553995.
- James, Declan J.; Kowalchyk, Judith A.; Daily, Nathan J.; Petrie, Matt; Martin, Thomas F. J. (2009). "CAPS drives trans-SNARE complex formation and membrane fusion through syntaxin interactions". Proceedings of the National Academy of Sciences of the United States of America. 106 (41): 17308–17313. doi:10.1073/pnas.0900758106. PMC 2765074. PMID 19805029.
- James, Declan J.; Martin, Thomas F. J. (2013). "CAPS and Munc13: CATCHRs that SNARE Vesicles". Frontiers in Endocrinology. 4: 187. doi:10.3389/fendo.2013.00187. PMC 3849599. PMID 24363652.
- Martin, Thomas F. J. (2015). "PI(4,5)P_{2}-binding effector proteins for vesicle exocytosis". Biochimica et Biophysica Acta (BBA) - Molecular and Cell Biology of Lipids. 1851 (6): 785–793. doi:10.1016/j.bbalip.2014.09.017. PMC 4380529. PMID 25280637.
- Yamaga, M.; Martin, T. F. J. (2025). "PI(4,5)P_{2} is a master regulator for Ca^{2+}-triggered vesicle exocytosis". Biochimica et Biophysica Acta (BBA) - Molecular and Cell Biology of Lipids. 1870 (6) 159651. doi:10.1016/j.bbalip.2025.159651. PMC 12341446. PMID 40543808.
