= Edible oil refining =

Edible oil refing process

Edible oil refining is a set of processes or treatments necessary to turn vegetable raw oil into edible oil.

Raw vegetable oil, obtained from seeds by pressing, solvent extraction, contains free fatty acids and other components such as phospholipids, waxes, peroxides, aldehydes, and ketones, which contribute to undesirable flavor, odor, and appearance; for these reasons, all the oil has to be refined.

== Steps ==
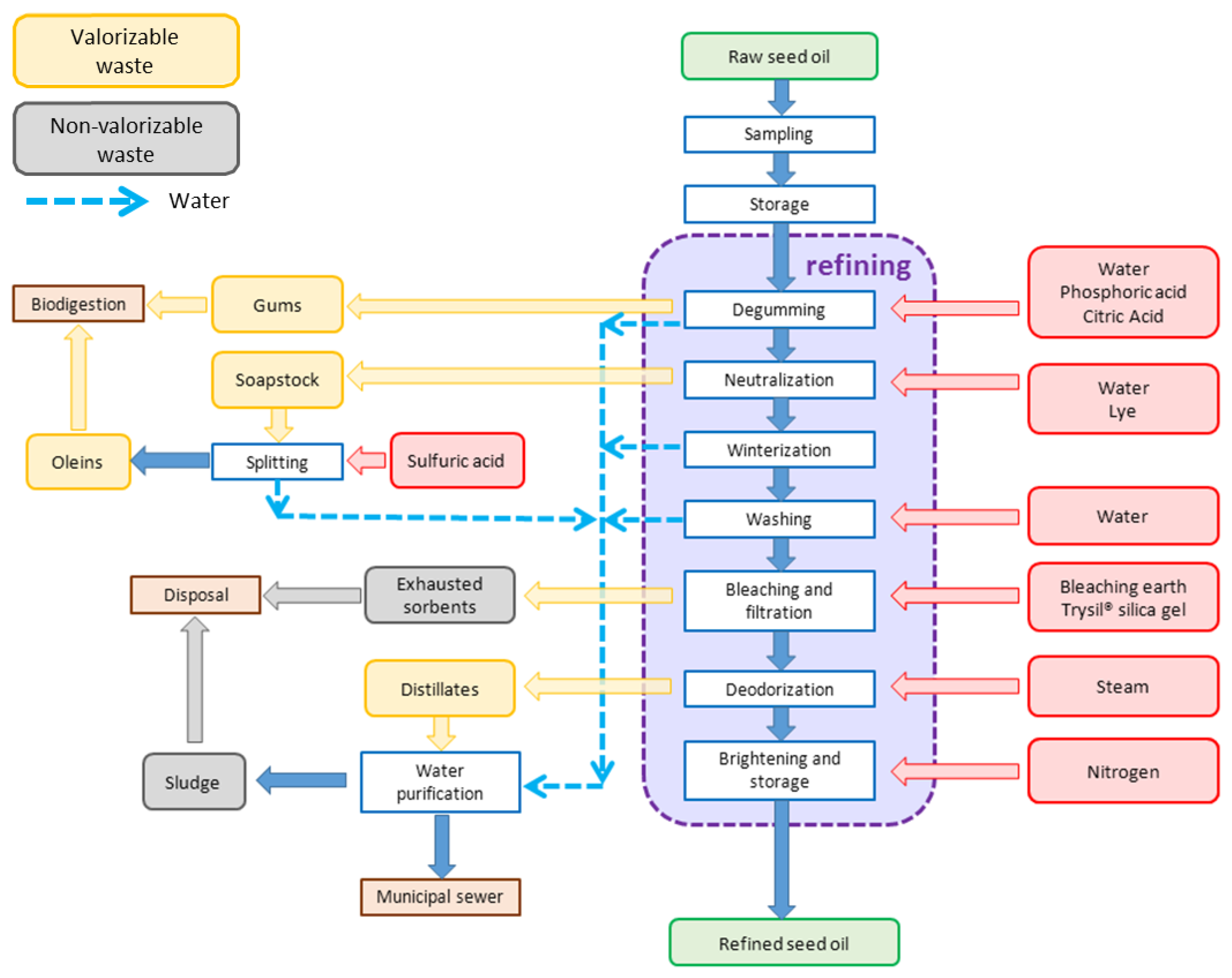
General block scheme of the refining process of edible oil

=== Degumming ===
Vegetable oil contains lecithins, phospholipids, and metals, which are generally called, because of their appearance, mucilaginous gums or simply gum. The process of elimination of the gums is called degumming. These gums are natural emulsifiers, that can cause an increase in viscosity which is an important parameter for the final product. Because of this physical problem, it is important to perform this first step since the high viscosity could create difficulties during the subsequent filtration steps.

Depending on the raw oil, these substances are more or less common, so degumming is not an obligatory step: it much depends on the value of lecithins of the source and the concentration of gums in the raw oil. For example, this step is more common in soybean and rapeseed oils, which contain much more gums, than sunflower oil. Because of that, different degumming processes are developed.

==== Dry degumming ====
This process is generally used when low phospholipids content is present, such as in coconut and in palm oil. Raw oil is mixed with a solution of citric acid, in order to coordinate metals and phospholipids. Usually, the mixture is sent directly to the bleaching treatment.

==== Soft degumming ====
In this process, the raw oil is treated with a water solution of a chelating agent. Similarly to the previous treatment, the solution coordinates metals and phospholipids, however the chelating agent used, such as EDTA, is able to remove more than 90% of phosphorus content in the matrix such as rapeseed oil.

==== Total degumming process ====
Also abbreviated as TOD, this is the traditional process where raw oil is treated with acid water and then treated with base, either in this step or during the neutralization.

==== Membrane degumming ====
In this process, it is used the ability of gums to form micelles, which are then separated using a process similar to ultrafiltration. Using this principle, it is possible to separate not only gums, but also other impurities, such as fatty acids, to limit further processes of the oil and reduce waste and energy to purify it. However, it is required the use of hexane to form the micelles, and in the processes in which is possible to avoid it, the flux is low, so it is not feasible on an industrial scale.

==== Enzymatic degumming ====
In this process enzymes, that are able to hydrolyze phospholipids, are added to the raw oil. With this method it is possible to avoid the use of high temperature and of acidic agents. However, the cost of enzymes and the necessity of different methods of separation represent big drawbacks of the process.

=== Neutralization ===
Neutralization consists of the removal of free fatty acids, which come from the partial natural hydrolysis of triglycerides. In the case of short fatty acids, this is done by steam stripping, such as in palm or coconut oil. Otherwise, pH is increased by adding a dilute solution sodium hydroxide or lime. The fatty acids are transformed into soaps, which are separated from the basic water phase, and submitted to a second treatment with hot water at 65-90 °C. The byproduct of this step is called soapstock.

==== Alternative processes ====
In order to minimize soapstock, energy usage, and the base used in the process, different experiments were done in an attempt to improve the process. For example, it was demonstrated that it is possible to separate some free fatty acids through membrane degumming.

Another technology has evaluated the esterification of free fatty acids with glycerol in order to reclaim vegetable oil, both with metal catalysis and by using microorganisms. However, all these attempts proved to be less convenient than the original neutralization process.

=== Winterization or dewaxing ===
Winterization or dewaxing is a process in which oil is separated from waxes, tocopherols, and residual phospholipids, which may cause turbidity issues in the oil if they remain present in the final product. In a standard process, room temperature oil is blandly stirred while it slowly cooled down, in order to crystallize all the high melting temperature substances. The solids are then separated either by decantation, filtration, centrifugation, or other solid liquid separation techniques.

Since crystallization is a difficult process, and natural oils show different composition and botanical sources, different variants were developed, in which different temperatures, residence times are used and the presence or introductions of surfactants, phospholipids or organic solvents are employed to optimize the separation.

=== Bleaching and filtration ===
Raw oil contains various pigments such as chlorophylls, carotenoids, xanthophyll, etc., which can cause problems with subsequent treatments or can color the final product during storage. This process aims to remove them using bleaching earth, which is a class of acidic clay that is capable to absorb oil's pigments and also metals. This process can be performed after or before winterization.

Oil is mixed with this earth in 0.2-2% weight ratio, then vacuum is applied and the suspension is heated at 70-140 °C to both improve the decomposition of fatty acid peroxides and the absorption of the pigment. After that, the oil is passed through a filter press. It is also possible to treat oil with silica to improve purification and metals removal.

=== Deodorization ===
During the final steps of the refining process, the oil is stripped with vapor at a high temperature to remove all remaining undesirable odors and flavors present in it. This step removes residual fatty acids, sterols, and other unsaponifiable substances. Usually, 270 °C vapor is used, but an inferior temperature could be applied if the oil has low odor content and if vacuum is applied. No alternative processes are considered currently.

=== Polishing ===
As a final step before conservation, another filtration is performed, similar to the one performed on wine. This is done to remove final residual impurities in the oil and to improve the final appearance.

== Waste valorization ==
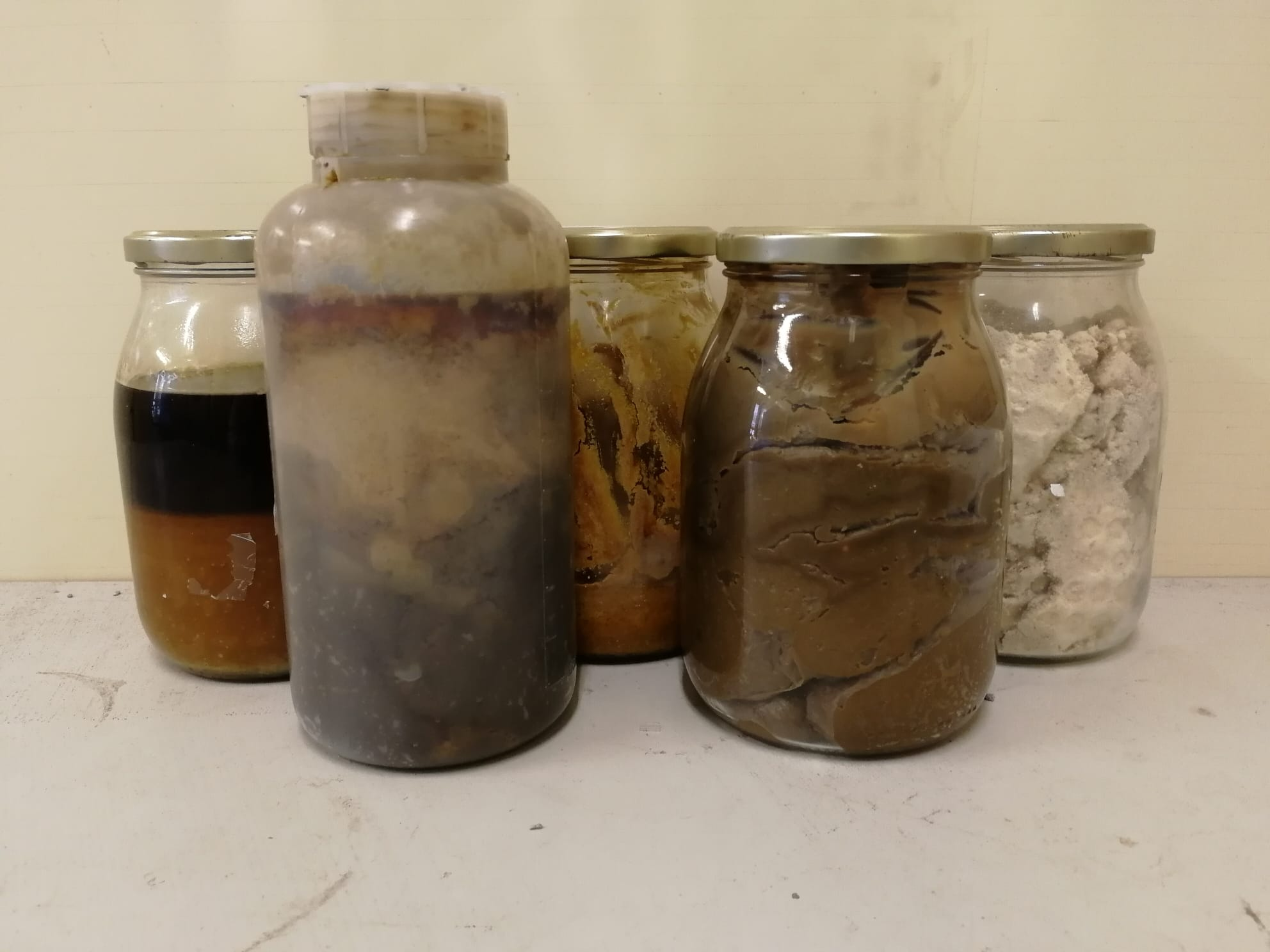
Soapstock and exhausted bleached earth from oil refining process, Politecninco di Milano, 2022

During the last decade, the advance in organic chemistry, enzymatic, metalorganic, and organocatalysis, made it possible not only to improve the process but also to recover some of the waste in order to implement a circular economy process and develop new chemical reactions for biorefinery.

=== Gums ===
Gums coming from the degumming process are usually purified and used as emulsifiers. If the lecithins are not valuable they can be disposed of in a bio-digestion process.

In a recent work it was demonstrated that it is possible to isolate and characterize the different phospholipids present in the gum discard. From the mixture they were able to obtain phosphatidic acid, with enzymatic catalysis, and to ferment other interesting phosphatidic esters.

=== Soapstock ===
Soapstock comes from the neutralization step and it contains alkaline water, sodium salts of fatty acid, residual tri -, di- and Monoglycerides, and other minor components. It represents 6% volume of the original mass. Usually, it is neutralized, separated to obtain oleins, and sent to bio-digest to recover energy.

Recently, oleic acid, recovered from high-oleic sunflower oil soapstock by enzymatic treatment, was submitted to a chemo-enzymatic oxidative cleavage, in order to produce pelargonic acid, and azelaic acid.

In another application it was possible to recover oleic acid, linoleic acid and linolenic acid and fermented, using a safe-to-eat probiotic Lacticaseibacillus rhamnosus, to (R)-10-hydroxystearic acid, (S)-(12Z)-10-hydroxy-octadecenoic acid, and (S)-(12Z,15Z)-10-hydroxyoctadecadienoic acid, respectively; these compounds can be use as intermediate compounds to produce flavor.

=== Exhausted sorbents ===
Exhausted bleaching earths are the waste of bleaching process. They are constituted by the earth and residual oil that represent 30-40% of the weight of the waste. They are considered dangerous because it can spontaneously catch fire. Because of this risk, typically this waste needs to be treated properly before disposal into landfills. However, this represents an environmental issue. Therefore, there are attempts to both regenerate the earth and reuse the remaining oil for the synthesis of biodiesel.

=== Winterization oil cake ===
The solid waste coming from winterization is often called winterization oil cake or just filter cake. It consist of 50-60% of oil, and the other parts of solid waxes. In sunflower oil, for example, waxes composition ranges from C36 to C60. The residual cake is usually disposed. However, it has been recently shown that waxes can be submitted to solid state fermentation, using Starmerella bombicola in combination with sources of sugar, such as beetroot molasses, and it can be exploited to produce surfactants.
