= Fat =

Esters of fatty acid or triglycerides

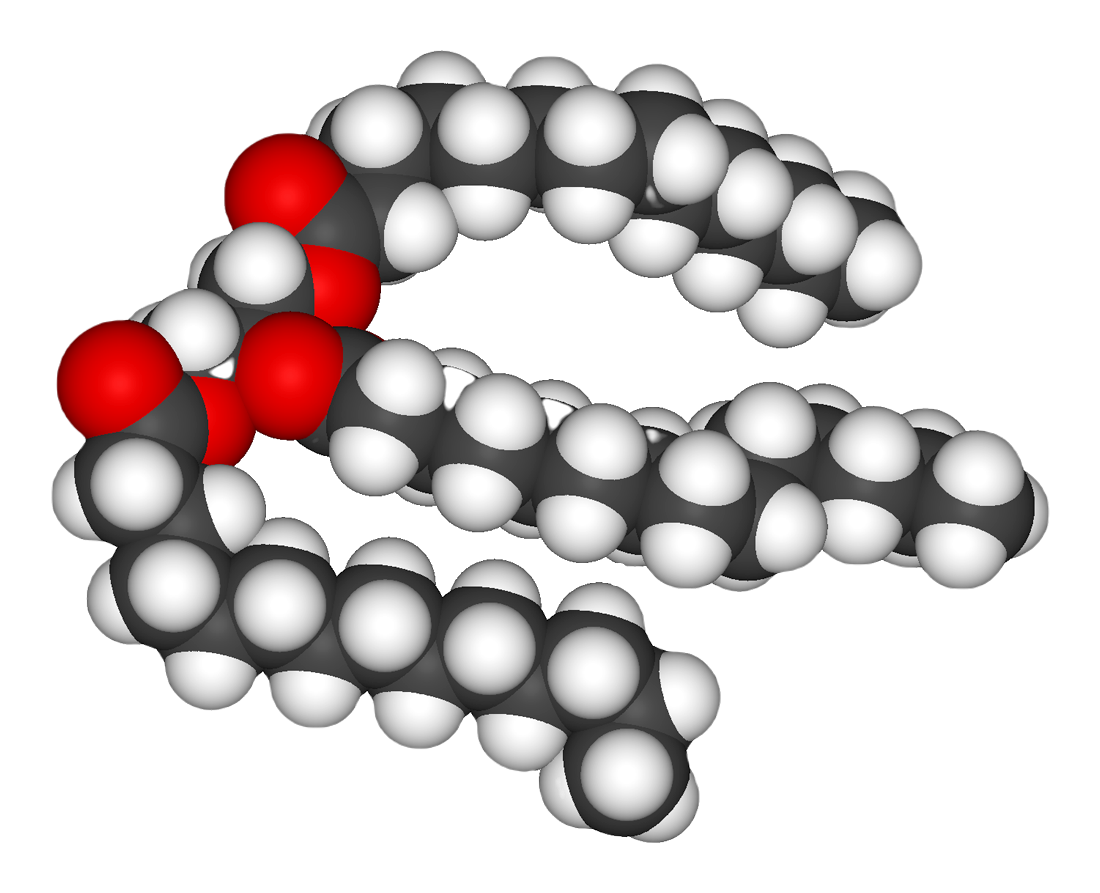
Idealized representation of a molecule of a typical triglyceride, the main type of fat. Note the three fatty acid chains attached to the central glycerol portion of the molecule.

Composition of fats from various foods, as percentage of their total fat

In nutrition, biology, and chemistry, fat usually means any ester of fatty acids, or a mixture of such compounds, most commonly those that occur in living beings or in food.

The term often refers specifically to triglycerides (triple esters of glycerol), that are the main components of vegetable oils and of fatty tissue in animals; or, even more narrowly, to triglycerides that are solid or semisolid at room temperature, thus excluding oils. The term may also be used more broadly as a synonym of lipid—any substance of biological relevance, composed of carbon, hydrogen, or oxygen, that is insoluble in water but soluble in non-polar solvents. In this sense, besides the triglycerides, the term would include several other types of compounds like mono- and diglycerides, phospholipids (such as lecithin), sterols (such as cholesterol), waxes (such as beeswax), and free fatty acids, which are usually present in human diet in smaller amounts.

Fats are one of the three main macronutrient groups in human diet, along with carbohydrates and proteins, and the main components of common food products like milk, butter, tallow, lard, salt pork, and cooking oils. They are a major and dense source of food energy for many animals and play important structural and metabolic functions in most living beings, including energy storage, waterproofing, and thermal insulation. The human body can produce the fat it requires from other food ingredients, except for a few essential fatty acids that must be included in the diet. Dietary fats are also the carriers of some flavor and aroma ingredients and vitamins that are not water-soluble.

== Biological importance ==
In humans and many other animals, fats serve both as energy sources and as stores for energy in excess of what the body needs immediately. Each gram of fat when burned or metabolized releases about nine food calories (37 kJ = 8.8 kcal).

Fats are also sources of essential fatty acids, an important dietary requirement. Vitamins A, D, E, and K are fat-soluble, meaning they can only be digested, absorbed, and transported in conjunction with fats.

Fats play a vital role in maintaining healthy skin and hair, insulating body organs against shock, maintaining body temperature, and promoting healthy cell function. Fat also serves as a useful buffer against a host of diseases. When a particular substance, whether chemical or biotic, reaches unsafe levels in the bloodstream, the body can effectively dilute—or at least maintain equilibrium of—the offending substances by storing it in new fat tissue. This helps to protect vital organs, until such time as the offending substances can be metabolized or removed from the body by such means as excretion, urination, accidental or intentional bloodletting, sebum excretion, and hair growth.

=== Adipose tissue ===
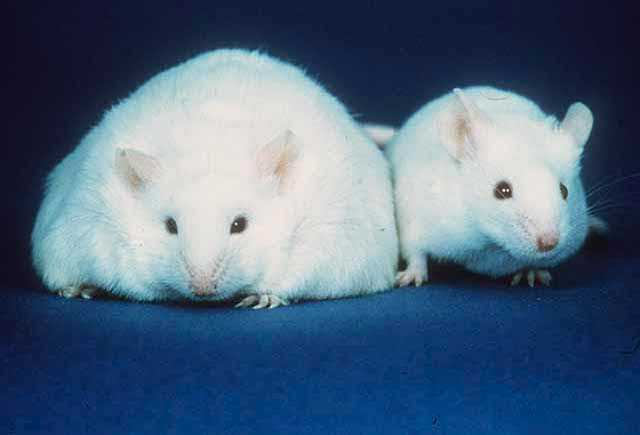
The obese mouse (left) has large stores of adipose tissue. For comparison, a mouse with a normal amount of adipose tissue is also shown (right).

In animals, adipose tissue (fatty tissue) is the body's means of storing metabolic energy over extended periods of time. Adipocytes (fat cells) store fat derived from the diet and from liver metabolism. Under energy stress these cells may degrade their stored fat to supply fatty acids and also glycerol to the circulation. These metabolic activities are regulated by several hormones (e.g., insulin, glucagon and epinephrine). Adipose tissue also secretes the hormone leptin.

== Production and processing ==
Cost comparison of fats and oils compared to other food groups, 2021

A variety of chemical and physical techniques are used for the production and processing of fats, both industrially and in cottage or home settings. They include:

- Pressing to extract liquid fats from fruits, seeds, or algae, e.g. olive oil from olives
- Solvent extraction using solvents like hexane or supercritical carbon dioxide
- Rendering – the melting of fat in adipose tissue, e.g. to produce tallow, lard, fish oil, and whale oil
- Churning of milk to produce butter
- Hydrogenation to increase the degree of saturation of the fatty acids
- Interesterification – the rearrangement of fatty acids across different triglycerides
- Winterization to remove oil components with higher melting points
- Clarification of butter

== Metabolism ==
Example of an unsaturated fat triglyceride. Left part: glycerol, right part from top to bottom: palmitic acid, oleic acid, alpha-linolenic acid. Chemical formula: C_{55}H_{98}O_{6}

The pancreatic lipase acts at the ester bond, hydrolyzing the bond and "releasing" the fatty acid. In triglyceride form, lipids cannot be absorbed by the duodenum. Fatty acids, monoglycerides (one glycerol, one fatty acid), and some diglycerides are absorbed by the duodenum, once the triglycerides have been broken down.

In the intestine, following the secretion of lipases and bile, triglycerides are split into monoacylglycerol and free fatty acids in a process called lipolysis. They are subsequently moved to absorptive enterocyte cells lining the intestines. The triglycerides are rebuilt in the enterocytes from their fragments and packaged together with cholesterol and proteins to form chylomicrons. These are excreted from the cells and collected by the lymph system and transported to the large vessels near the heart before being mixed into the blood. Various tissues can capture the chylomicrons, releasing the triglycerides to be used as a source of energy. Liver cells can synthesize and store triglycerides. When the body requires fatty acids as an energy source, the hormone glucagon signals the breakdown of the triglycerides by hormone-sensitive lipase to release free fatty acids. As the brain cannot utilize fatty acids as an energy source (unless converted to a ketone), the glycerol component of triglycerides can be converted into glucose, via gluconeogenesis by conversion into dihydroxyacetone phosphate and then into glyceraldehyde 3-phosphate, for brain fuel when it is broken down. Fat cells may also be broken down for that reason if the brain's needs ever outweigh the body's.

Triglycerides cannot pass through cell membranes freely. Special enzymes on the walls of blood vessels called lipoprotein lipases must break down triglycerides into free fatty acids and glycerol. Fatty acids can then be taken up by cells via fatty acid transport proteins (FATPs).

Triglycerides, as major components of very-low-density lipoprotein (VLDL) and chylomicrons, play an important role in metabolism as energy sources and transporters of dietary fat. They contain more than twice as much energy (approximately 9 kcal/g or 38 kJ/g) as carbohydrates (approximately 4 kcal/g or 17 kJ/g).

== Nutritional and health aspects ==
The most common type of fat, in human diet and most living beings, is a triglyceride, an ester of the triple alcohol glycerol H(–CHOH–)_{3}H and three fatty acids. The molecule of a triglyceride can be described as resulting from a condensation reaction (specifically, esterification) between each of glycerol's –OH groups and the HO– part of the carboxyl group HO(O=)C− of each fatty acid, forming an ester bridge −O−(O=)C− with elimination of a water molecule H_{2}O.

Other less common types of fats include diglycerides and monoglycerides, where the esterification is limited to two or just one of glycerol's –OH groups. Other alcohols, such as cetyl alcohol (predominant in spermaceti), may replace glycerol. In the phospholipids, one of the fatty acids is replaced by phosphoric acid or a monoester thereof. The benefits and risks of various amounts and types of dietary fats have been the object of much study, and are still highly controversial topics.

=== Essential fatty acids ===
There are two essential fatty acids (EFAs) in human nutrition: alpha-Linolenic acid (an omega-3 fatty acid) and linoleic acid (an omega-6 fatty acid). The adult body can synthesize other lipids that it needs from these two.

== Dietary sources ==
Properties of vegetable oils The nutritional values are expressed as percent (%) by mass of total fat.
Type	Processing treatment	Saturated fatty acids	Monounsaturated fatty acids		Polyunsaturated fatty acids				Smoke point
Type	Processing treatment	Saturated fatty acids	Total	Oleic acid (ω−9)	Total	α-Linolenic acid (ω−3)	Linoleic acid (ω−6)	ω−6:3 ratio	Smoke point
Avocado		11.6	70.6	67.9	13.5	1	12.5	12.5:1	250 °C (482 °F)
Brazil nut		17.6	26.7	26.1	55.7	0.1	55.6	457:1	208 °C (406 °F)
Canola		7.4	63.3	61.8	28.1	9.1	18.6	2:1	204 °C (400 °F)
Coconut		82.5	6.3	6	1.7	0.019	1.68	88:1	175 °C (347 °F)
Corn		12.9	27.6	27.3	54.7	1	58	58:1	232 °C (450 °F)
Cottonseed		25.9	17.8	19	51.9	1	54	54:1	216 °C (420 °F)
Cottonseed	hydrogenated	93.6	1.5		0.6	0.2	0.3	1.5:1	
Flaxseed/linseed		9.0	18.4	18	67.8	53	13	0.2:1	107 °C (225 °F)
Grape seed		9.6	16.1	15.8	69.9	0.10	69.6	very high	216 °C (421 °F)
Hemp seed		7.0	9.0	9.0	82.0	22.0	54.0	2.5:1	166 °C (330 °F)
High-oleic safflower oil		7.5	75.2	75.2	12.8	0	12.8	very high	212 °C (414 °F)
Olive (extra virgin)		13.8	73.0	71.3	10.5	0.7	9.8	14:1	193 °C (380 °F)
Palm		49.3	37.0	40	9.3	0.2	9.1	45.5:1	235 °C (455 °F)
Palm	hydrogenated	88.2	5.7		0				
Peanut		16.2	57.1	55.4	19.9	0.318	19.6	61.6:1	232 °C (450 °F)
Rice bran oil		25	38.4	38.4	36.6	2.2	34.4	15.6:1	232 °C (450 °F)
Sesame		14.2	39.7	39.3	41.7	0.3	41.3	138:1	
Soybean		15.6	22.8	22.6	57.7	7	51	7.3:1	238 °C (460 °F)
Soybean	partially hydrogenated	14.9	43.0	42.5	37.6	2.6	34.9	13.4:1	
Sunflower oil		8.99	63.4	62.9	20.7	0.16	20.5	128:1	227 °C (440 °F)
Walnut oil	unrefined	9.1	22.8	22.2	63.3	10.4	52.9	5:1	160 °C (320 °F)

=== Saturated vs. unsaturated fats ===
Different foods contain different amounts of fat with different proportions of saturated and unsaturated fatty acids. Some animal products, like beef and dairy products made with whole or reduced fat milk like yogurt, ice cream, cheese and butter have mostly saturated fatty acids (and some have significant contents of dietary cholesterol). Other animal products, like pork, poultry, eggs, and seafood have mostly unsaturated fats. Industrialized baked goods may use fats with high unsaturated fat contents as well, especially those containing partially hydrogenated oils, and processed foods that are deep-fried in hydrogenated oil are high in saturated fat content.

Plants and fish oil generally contain a higher proportion of unsaturated acids, although there are exceptions such as coconut oil and palm kernel oil. Foods containing unsaturated fats include avocado, nuts, olive oils, and vegetable oils such as canola.

Many scientific studies have found that replacing saturated fats with cis unsaturated fats in the diet reduces risk of cardiovascular diseases (CVDs), diabetes, or death. These studies prompted many medical organizations and public health departments, including the World Health Organization (WHO), to officially issue that advice. Some countries with such recommendations include:

- United Kingdom
- United States
- India
- Canada
- Australia
- Singapore
- New Zealand
- Hong Kong

A 2004 review concluded that "no lower safe limit of specific saturated fatty acid intakes has been identified" and recommended that the influence of varying saturated fatty acid intakes against a background of different individual lifestyles and genetic backgrounds should be the focus in future studies.

This advice is often oversimplified by labeling the two kinds of fats as bad fats and good fats, respectively. However, since the fats and oils in most natural and traditionally processed foods contain both unsaturated and saturated fatty acids, the complete exclusion of saturated fat is unrealistic and possibly unwise. For instance, some foods rich in saturated fat, such as coconut and palm oil, are an important source of cheap dietary calories for a large fraction of the population in developing countries.

Concerns were also expressed at a 2010 conference of the American Dietetic Association that a blanket recommendation to avoid saturated fats could drive people to also reduce the amount of polyunsaturated fats, which may have health benefits, and/or replace fats by refined carbohydrates — which carry a high risk of obesity and heart disease.

For these reasons, the U.S. Food and Drug Administration, for example, recommends to consume less than 10% (7% for high-risk groups) of calories from saturated fat, with 15-30% of total calories from all fat. A general 7% limit was recommended also by the American Heart Association (AHA) in 2006.

The WHO/FAO report also recommended replacing fats so as to reduce the content of myristic and palmitic acids, specifically.

The so-called Mediterranean diet, prevalent in many countries in the Mediterranean Sea area, includes more total fat than the diet of Northern European countries, but most of it is in the form of unsaturated fatty acids (specifically, monounsaturated and omega-3) from olive oil and fish, vegetables, and certain meats like lamb, while consumption of saturated fat is minimal in comparison. A 2017 review found evidence that a Mediterranean-style diet could reduce the risk of cardiovascular diseases, overall cancer incidence, neurodegenerative diseases, diabetes, and mortality rate. A 2018 review showed that a Mediterranean-like diet may improve overall health status, such as reduced risk of non-communicable diseases. It also may reduce the social and economic costs of diet-related illnesses.

A small number of contemporary reviews have challenged this negative view of saturated fats. For example, an evaluation of evidence from 1966 to 1973 of the observed health impact of replacing dietary saturated fat with linoleic acid found that it increased rates of death from all causes, coronary heart disease, and cardiovascular disease. These studies have been disputed by many scientists, and the consensus in the medical community is that saturated fat and cardiovascular disease are closely related. Still, these discordant studies fueled debate over the merits of substituting polyunsaturated fats for saturated fats.

==== Cardiovascular disease ====
The effect of saturated fat on cardiovascular disease has been extensively studied. The general consensus is that there is evidence of moderate-quality of a strong, consistent, and graded relationship between saturated fat intake, blood cholesterol levels, and the incidence of cardiovascular disease. The relationships are accepted as causal, including by many government and medical organizations.

A 2017 review by the AHA estimated that replacement of saturated fat with polyunsaturated fat in the American diet could reduce the risk of cardiovascular diseases by 30%.

The consumption of saturated fat is generally considered a risk factor for dyslipidemia—abnormal blood lipid levels, including high total cholesterol, high levels of triglycerides, high levels of low-density lipoprotein (LDL, "bad" cholesterol) or low levels of high-density lipoprotein (HDL, "good" cholesterol). These parameters in turn are believed to be risk indicators for some types of cardiovascular disease. These effects were observed in children too.

Several meta-analyses (reviews and consolidations of multiple previously published experimental studies) have confirmed a significant relationship between saturated fat and high serum cholesterol levels, which in turn have been claimed to have a causal relation with increased risk of cardiovascular disease (the so-called lipid hypothesis). However, high cholesterol may be caused by many factors. Other indicators, such as high LDL/HDL ratio, have proved to be more predictive. In a study of myocardial infarction in 52 countries, the ApoB/ApoA1 (related to LDL and HDL, respectively) ratio was the strongest predictor of CVD among all risk factors. There are other pathways involving obesity, triglyceride levels, insulin sensitivity, endothelial function, and thrombogenicity, among others, that play a role in CVD, although it seems, in the absence of an adverse blood lipid profile, the other known risk factors have only a weak atherogenic effect. Different saturated fatty acids have differing effects on various lipid levels.

==== Cancer ====
The evidence for a relation between saturated fat intake and cancer is significantly weaker, and there does not seem to be a clear medical consensus about it.

- Several reviews of case–control studies have found that saturated fat intake is associated with increased breast cancer risk.
- Another review found limited evidence for a positive relationship between consuming animal fat and incidence of colorectal cancer.
- Other meta-analyses found evidence for increased risk of ovarian cancer by high consumption of saturated fat.
- Some studies have indicated that serum myristic acid and palmitic acid and dietary myristic and palmitic saturated fatty acids and serum palmitic combined with alpha-tocopherol supplementation are associated with increased risk of prostate cancer in a dose-dependent manner. These associations may, however, reflect differences in intake or metabolism of these fatty acids between the precancer cases and controls, rather than being an actual cause.

==== Bones ====
Various animal studies have indicated that the intake of saturated fat has a negative effect on the mineral density of bones. One study suggested that men may be particularly vulnerable.

==== Disposition and overall health ====
Studies have shown that substituting monounsaturated fatty acids for saturated ones is associated with increased daily physical activity and resting energy expenditure. More physical activity, less anger, and less irritability were associated with a higher-oleic acid diet than one of a palmitic acid diet.

Amounts of fat types in selected foods

=== Monounsaturated vs. polyunsaturated fat ===
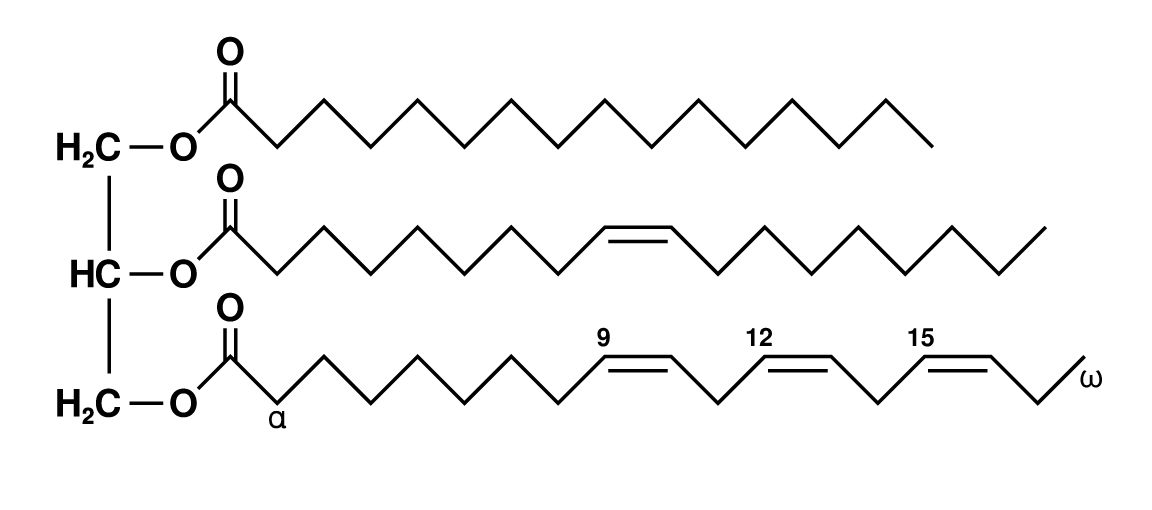
Schematic diagram of a triglyceride with a saturated fatty acid (top), a monounsaturated one (middle) and a polyunsaturated one (bottom)

The most common fatty acids in human diet are unsaturated or mono-unsaturated. Monounsaturated fats are found in animal flesh such as red meat, whole milk products, nuts, and high fat fruits such as olives and avocados. Olive oil is about 75% monounsaturated fat. The high oleic variety sunflower oil contains at least 70% monounsaturated fat. Canola oil and cashews are both about 58% monounsaturated fat. Tallow (beef fat) is about 50% monounsaturated fat, and lard is about 40% monounsaturated fat. Other sources include hazelnut, avocado oil, macadamia nut oil, grapeseed oil, groundnut oil (peanut oil), sesame oil, corn oil, popcorn, whole grain wheat, cereal, oatmeal, almond oil, hemp oil, and tea-oil camellia.

Polyunsaturated fatty acids can be found mostly in nuts, seeds, fish, seed oils, and oysters.

Food sources of polyunsaturated fats include:

Food source (100g)	Polyunsaturated fat (g)
Walnuts	47
Canola oil	34
Sunflower seeds	33
Sesame seeds	26
Chia seeds	23.7
Unsalted peanuts	16
Peanut butter	14.2
Avocado oil	13.5
Olive oil	11
Safflower oil	12.82
Seaweed	11
Sardines	5
Soybeans	7
Tuna	14
Wild salmon	17.3
Whole grain wheat	9.7

==== Insulin resistance (sensitivity) ====
MUFAs (especially oleic acid) have been found to lower the incidence of insulin resistance; PUFAs (especially large amounts of arachidonic acid) and SFAs (such as arachidic acid) increased it. These ratios can be indexed in the phospholipids of human skeletal muscle and in other tissues as well. The relationship between dietary fats and insulin resistance is presumed secondary to the relationship between insulin resistance and inflammation, which is partially modulated by dietary fat ratios (omega−3/6/9), with both omega‍–‍3 and ‍–‍9 thought to be anti-inflammatory and omega‍–‍6 pro-inflammatory (as well as by numerous other dietary components, particularly polyphenols and exercise, with both of these anti-inflammatory). Although both pro- and anti-inflammatory types of fat are biologically necessary, fat dietary ratios in most U.S. diets are skewed towards omega‍–‍6, with subsequent disinhibition of inflammation and potentiation of insulin resistance. This is contrary to the suggestion that polyunsaturated fats are shown to be protective against insulin resistance.

The large-scale KANWU study found that increasing MUFA and decreasing SFA intake could improve insulin sensitivity, but only when the overall fat intake of the diet was low. However, some MUFAs may promote insulin resistance (like the SFAs), whereas PUFAs may protect against it.

==== Cancer ====
Levels of oleic acid along with other MUFAs in red blood cell membranes were positively associated with breast cancer risk. The saturation index (SI) of the same membranes was inversely associated with breast cancer risk. MUFAs and low SI in erythrocyte membranes are predictors of postmenopausal breast cancer. Both of these variables depend on the activity of the enzyme delta-9 desaturase (Δ9-d).

Results from observational clinical trials on PUFA intake and cancer have been inconsistent and vary by numerous factors of cancer incidence, including gender and genetic risk. Some studies have shown associations between higher intakes and/or blood levels of omega-3 PUFAs and a decreased risk of certain cancers, including breast and colorectal cancer, while other studies found no associations with cancer risk.

==== Pregnancy disorders ====
Polyunsaturated fat supplementation was found to have no effect on the incidence of pregnancy-related disorders, such as hypertension or preeclampsia, but may increase the length of gestation slightly and decreased the incidence of early premature births.

Expert panels in the United States and Europe recommend that pregnant and lactating women consume higher amounts of polyunsaturated fats than the general population to enhance the DHA status of the fetus and newborn.

=== "Cis fat" vs. "trans fat" ===
In nature, unsaturated fatty acids generally have double bonds in cis configuration (with the adjacent C–C bonds on the same side) as opposed to trans. Nevertheless, trans fatty acids (TFAs) occur in small amounts in meat and milk of ruminants (such as cattle and sheep), typically 2‍–‍5% of total fat. Natural TFAs, which include conjugated linoleic acid (CLA) and vaccenic acid, originate in the rumen of these animals. CLA has two double bonds, one in the cis configuration and one in trans, which makes it simultaneously a cis- and a trans-fatty acid.

The trans fat content in various natural and traditionally processed foods is shown in the table below.

Food type	Trans fat content (grams per 100 g)
Butter	2 to 7 g
Whole milk	0.07 to 0.1 g
Animal fat	0 to 5 g
Ground beef	1 g

The processing of fats by hydrogenation can convert some unsaturated fats into trans fats. The presence of trans fats in various processed foods has received much attention.

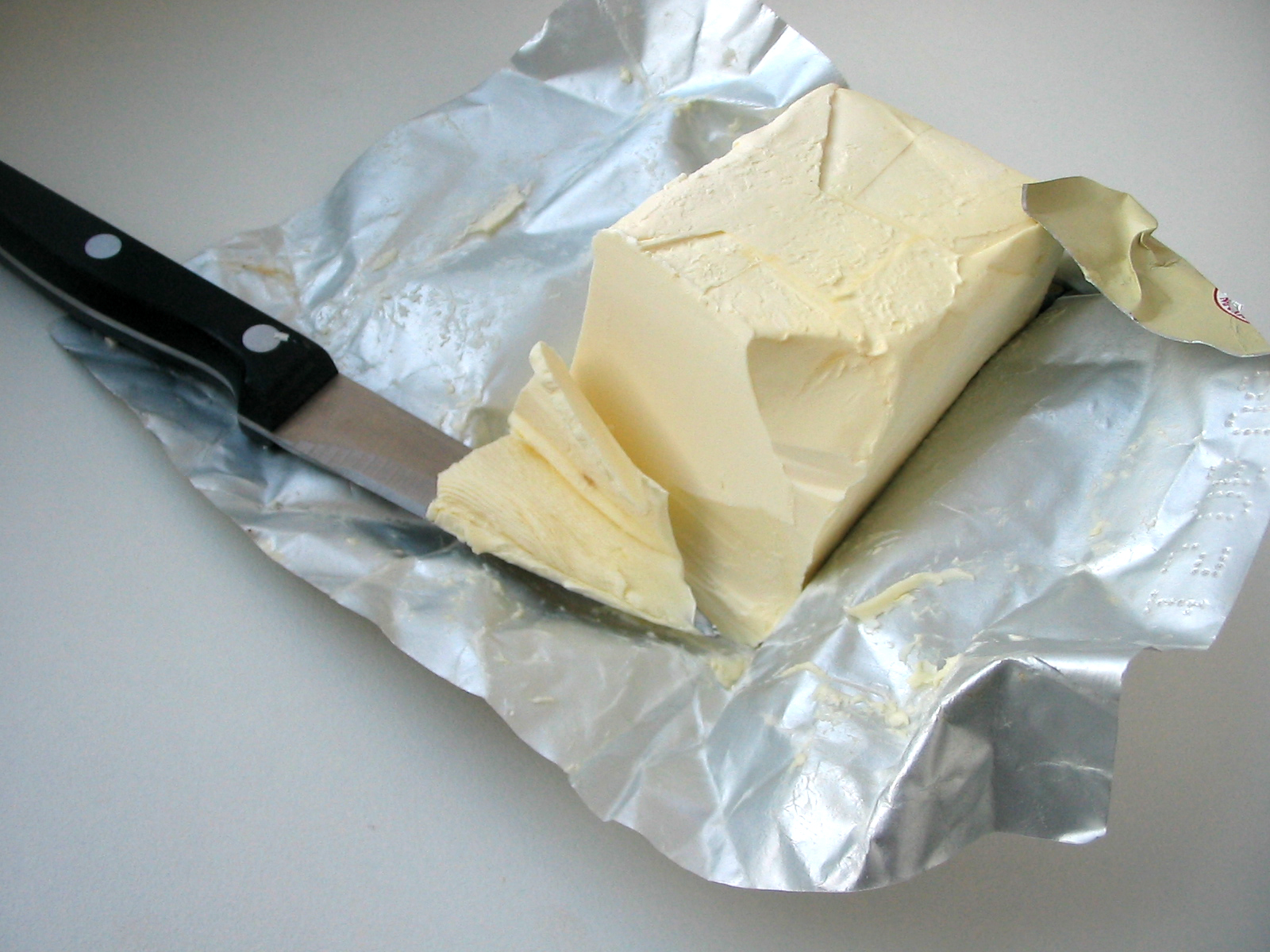
Margarine is a common product that can contain trans fats.

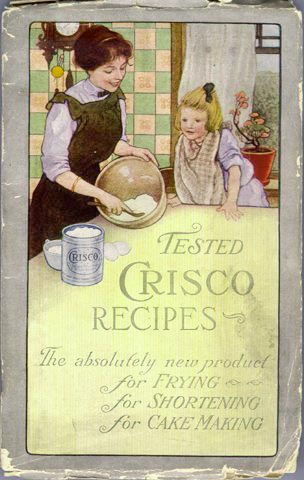
Cover of the original Crisco cookbook, 1912. Crisco was made by hydrogenating cottonseed oil. The formula was revised in the 2000s and now has only a small amount of trans fat.

=== Omega-three and omega-six fatty acids ===
The ω−3 fatty acids have received substantial attention. Among omega-3 fatty acids, neither long-chain nor short-chain forms were consistently associated with breast cancer risk. High levels of docosahexaenoic acid (DHA), however, the most abundant omega-3 polyunsaturated fatty acid in erythrocyte (red blood cell) membranes, were associated with a reduced risk of breast cancer. The DHA obtained through the consumption of polyunsaturated fatty acids is positively associated with cognitive and behavioral performance. In addition, DHA is vital for the grey matter structure of the human brain, as well as retinal stimulation and neurotransmission.

=== Interesterification ===
Some studies have investigated the health effects of interesterified (IE) fats, by comparing diets with IE and non-IE fats with the same overall fatty acid composition.

Several experimental studies in humans found no statistical difference on fasting blood lipids between a diet with large amounts of IE fat, having 25-40% C16:0 or C18:0 on the 2-position, and a similar diet with non-IE fat, having only 3-9% C16:0 or C18:0 on the 2-position. A negative result was obtained also in a study that compared the effects on blood cholesterol levels of an IE fat product mimicking cocoa butter and the real non-IE product. Another study found tentative evidence that interesterified fat may lower cardiovascular disease risk.

A 2007 study funded by the Malaysian Palm Oil Board claimed that replacing natural palm oil by other interesterified or partially hydrogenated fats caused adverse health effects, such as higher LDL/HDL ratio and plasma glucose levels. However, these effects could be attributed to the higher percentage of saturated acids in the IE and partially hydrogenated fats, rather than to the IE process itself.

=== Rancification ===
Unsaturated fats undergo auto-oxidation, which involves replacement of a C-H bond with C-OH unit. The process requires oxygen (air) and is accelerated by the presence of traces of metals, which serve as catalysts. Doubly unsaturated fatty acids are particularly prone to this reaction. Vegetable oils resist this process to a small degree because they contain antioxidants, such as tocopherol. Fats and oils often are treated with chelating agents such as citric acid to remove the metal catalysts.

=== Role in disease ===
In the human body, high levels of triglycerides in the bloodstream have been linked to atherosclerosis, heart disease and stroke. However, the relative negative impact of raised levels of triglycerides compared to that of LDL:HDL ratios is as yet unknown. The risk can be partly accounted for by a strong inverse relationship between triglyceride level and HDL-cholesterol level. But the risk is also due to high triglyceride levels increasing the quantity of small, dense LDL particles.

=== Guidelines ===
The National Cholesterol Education Program has set guidelines for triglyceride levels:

Level		Interpretation
(mg/dL)	(mmol/L)	Interpretation
< 150	< 1.70	Normal range – low risk
150–199	1.70–2.25	Slightly above normal
200–499	2.26–5.65	Some risk
500 or higher	> 5.65	Very high – high risk

These levels are tested after fasting for 8 to 12 hours. Triglyceride levels remain temporarily higher for a period after eating.

The AHA recommends an optimal triglyceride level of 100 mg/dL (1.1 mmol/L) or lower to improve heart health.

=== Reducing triglyceride levels ===
Lifestyle changes including weight loss, exercise and dietary modification may improve hypertriglyceridemia. This may include dietary changes such as restriction of fat and carbohydrates (specifically fructose and sugar-sweetened beverages) and increased consumption of omega-3 fatty acids from algae, nuts, and seeds.

The decision to treat hypertriglyceridemia with medication depends on the levels and on the presence of other risk factors for cardiovascular disease. Very high levels that would increase the risk of pancreatitis is treated with a drug from the fibrate class. Niacin and omega-3 fatty acids as well as drugs from the statin class may be used in conjunction, with statins being the main drug treatment for moderate hypertriglyceridemia where reduction of cardiovascular risk is required. Medications are recommended in those with high levels of triglycerides that are not corrected with lifestyle modifications, with fibrates being recommended first. Epanova (omega-3-carboxylic acids) is another prescription drug used to treat very high levels of blood triglycerides.

== See also ==
- Diet and heart disease
- Fatty acid synthesis
- Food composition data
- Western pattern diet
