= E472 =

As an E number, E472 may refer to:

- E472a: acetic acid esters of mono- and diglycerides of fatty acids
- E472b: lactic acid esters of mono- and diglycerides of fatty acids
- E472c: citric acid esters of mono- and diglycerides of fatty acids
- E472d: tartaric acid esters of mono- and diglycerides of fatty acids
- E472e: mono- and diacetyl tartaric acid esters of mono- and diglycerides of fatty acids
- E472f: mixed acetic and tartaric acid esters of mono- and diglycerides of fatty acids
