= Apeel Sciences =

Company

- Type: Private
- Founded: 2012
- Founder: James Rogers
- Headquarters: Goleta, California
- Website: apeel.com

Apeel Sciences is an American food technology company based in Goleta, California. Its edible coating product Apeel or Edipeel can make avocados, citrus and other types of fruit last twice as long as usual by using a tasteless edible coating, and reduces food loss and waste as well as reliance on single-use plastic packaging.

== Product ==
The ingredients in Apeel’s Edipeel formulation are mono- and diglycerides.

The edible coating’s ingredients are inspired by and contain the same ingredients found in the cuticles (peel) of plants, and the formulations are alternatives to fruit waxing and the use of single-use plastics.

Mono- and diglycerides are naturally present in food fats, and have also been used as food additives in many common foods worldwide since the 1930s. The World Health Organization’s (WHO) report on the toxicological evaluation of mono- and diglycerides states that, “Mono- and diglycerides are consumed every day in any normal mixed diet and they are also formed from triglycerides during the digestion and absorption of every meal containing fat. No harmful effects have been specifically associated with mono- and diglycerides.”

There are publicly available documents, like a GRAS submission and patents, that Apeel submitted early in their R&D stages that describe the use of solvents. The key solvents used in the extraction and purification process of the product’s ingredients, such as mono- and diglycerides, include:

1. Ethyl Acetate – A solvent commonly used in food processing but also associated with potential central nervous system effects if present in high quantities.

2. Heptane – Another solvent that can affect the central nervous system, potentially causing headaches, nausea, and dizziness in cases of overexposure.

3. Palladium – Used as a catalyst in the manufacturing process, though traces of it can sometimes remain in products, raising concerns about contamination.

Apeel has since adopted a more industry standard way of manufacturing mono- and diglycerides, which does not rely on solvents.

The coating's formulation can be modified for strawberries, mangoes, apples, bananas, kumquats, citrus, and asparagus. Edipeel is also allowed for use on all fruits and vegetables in Canada, Chile, China, Colombia, Japan, Kenya, Mexico, Peru, and South Africa, without restriction. Additionally, Edipeel is allowed for use on the following fruits in the European Union, Norway, Switzerland, and the United Kingdom: avocados, citrus fruit, mangoes, papayas, melons, bananas, pineapples, and pomegranates.

== Founding ==
Apeel was founded in 2012 by James Rogers, after receiving a $100,000 grant from the Bill and Melinda Gates Foundation to help reduce post-harvest food waste in developing countries that lacked refrigeration infrastructure.

It also received $985,161 from the Gates Foundation on August 2015

After the initial grants, backing has been provided by venture capitalist firm Andreessen Horowitz, and ATEL Capital Group. Apeel has raised $110 million in financing to date.

In June 2018, Apeel was named a World Economic Forum Technology Pioneer. In August 2018, Apeel announced the appointment of former Whole Foods Market co-CEO Walter Robb to its board of directors.

== Disinformation Campaign ==
In the Spring of 2023, Apeel was targeted with a disinformation campaign online. The disinformation initially conflated Apeel’s primary product with a similarly named household cleaning product and maintained the ingredients were harmful to humans, even though the companies and products are completely unrelated. The disinformation also inaccurately inflates Bill Gates’ involvement with the company. While the Bill and Melinda Gates foundation provided early grant funding, Bill Gates has no involvement with nor any ownership stake in Apeel.

Further false information has appeared in social media posts claiming Apeel’s edible food coatings are “toxic” to humans. However, the US FDA, global regulatory agencies, and other food and nutrition experts have affirmed the safety of Apeel’s products for consumption by consumers.

Additional posts have falsely claimed that heavy metals were being intentionally added to and left in Apeel’s products, incorrectly interpreting the data reported in Apeel’s historical GRAS notices, which are not representative of how Apeel’s ingredients are currently manufactured (i.e., using standard manufacturing processes for mono- and diglycerides). Apeel does not add heavy metals as an ingredient during the manufacturing process. Agricultural feedstocks have naturally occurring levels of heavy metal impurities due to the uptake of these substances from the surrounding soil, air, and water. However, the production and processing of these agricultural feedstocks must remove such impurities to levels below their regulated safe limits.

== See also ==
- Edible packaging
