= Refined oil =

Refined oil may refer to:

- Refined edible oil, Edible oil refining result
- Petroleum products derived from crude oil (petroleum) as it is processed in oil refineries

== See also ==
- Refined resource
