= C6H8O6 =

The molecular formula C_{6}H_{8}O_{6} (molar mass: 176.124 g/mol) may be:

- Ascorbic acid (vitamin C)
- Erythorbic acid
- Glucuronolactone
- Propane-1,2,3-tricarboxylic acid
- Triformin
