= MOGAT3 =

Protein-coding gene in the species Homo sapiens

Identifiers
- Aliases: MOGAT3, DC7, DGAT2L7, MGAT3, DGAT2L2, monoacylglycerol O-acyltransferase 3
- External IDs: OMIM: 610184; GeneCards: MOGAT3
Enzyme activity
EC #	BRENDA	ExPASy	KEGG	MetaCyc
2.3.1.20	↗	↗	↗	↗
2.3.1.22	↗	↗	↗	↗

Gene location (Human)
Chr.	Chromosome 7 (human)
Band	7q22.1	Start	101,195,007 bp
Band	7q22.1	End	101,201,038 bp
RNA expression pattern
Bgee	Human / Mouse (ortholog); Top expressed in: mucosa of transverse colon; mucosa of ileum; rectum; right lobe of liver; duodenum; testicle; jejunal mucosa; mucosa of sigmoid colon; appendix; epithelium of colon / n/a; More reference expression data
BioGPS	n/a
Gene ontology
Molecular function	acyltransferase activity; acyltransferase activity, transferring groups other than amino-acyl groups; transferase activity; diacylglycerol O-acyltransferase activity; 2-acylglycerol O-acyltransferase activity
Cellular component	membrane; integral component of membrane; endoplasmic reticulum; endoplasmic reticulum membrane
Biological process	lipid metabolism; glycerol metabolic process; triglyceride biosynthetic process
Sources:Amigo / QuickGO
Orthologs
Databases	NCBI: entry; OMA: entry
Species	Human	Mouse
Entrez	346606	n/a
Ensembl	ENSG00000106384	n/a
UniProt	Q86VF5	n/a
RefSeq (mRNA)	NM_001287147; NM_178176	n/a
RefSeq (protein)	NP_001274076; NP_835470	n/a
Location (UCSC)	Chr 7: 101.2 – 101.2 Mb	n/a
PubMed search		n/a
- Wikidata
View/Edit Human

Monoacylglycerol O-acyltransferase 3 is a protein that in humans is encoded by the MOGAT3 gene.

== Function ==
Acyl-CoA:monoacylglycerol acyltransferase (MOGAT; EC 2.3.1.22) catalyzes the synthesis of diacylglycerol from 2-monoacylglycerol and fatty acyl-CoA.
