= Glycerolysis =

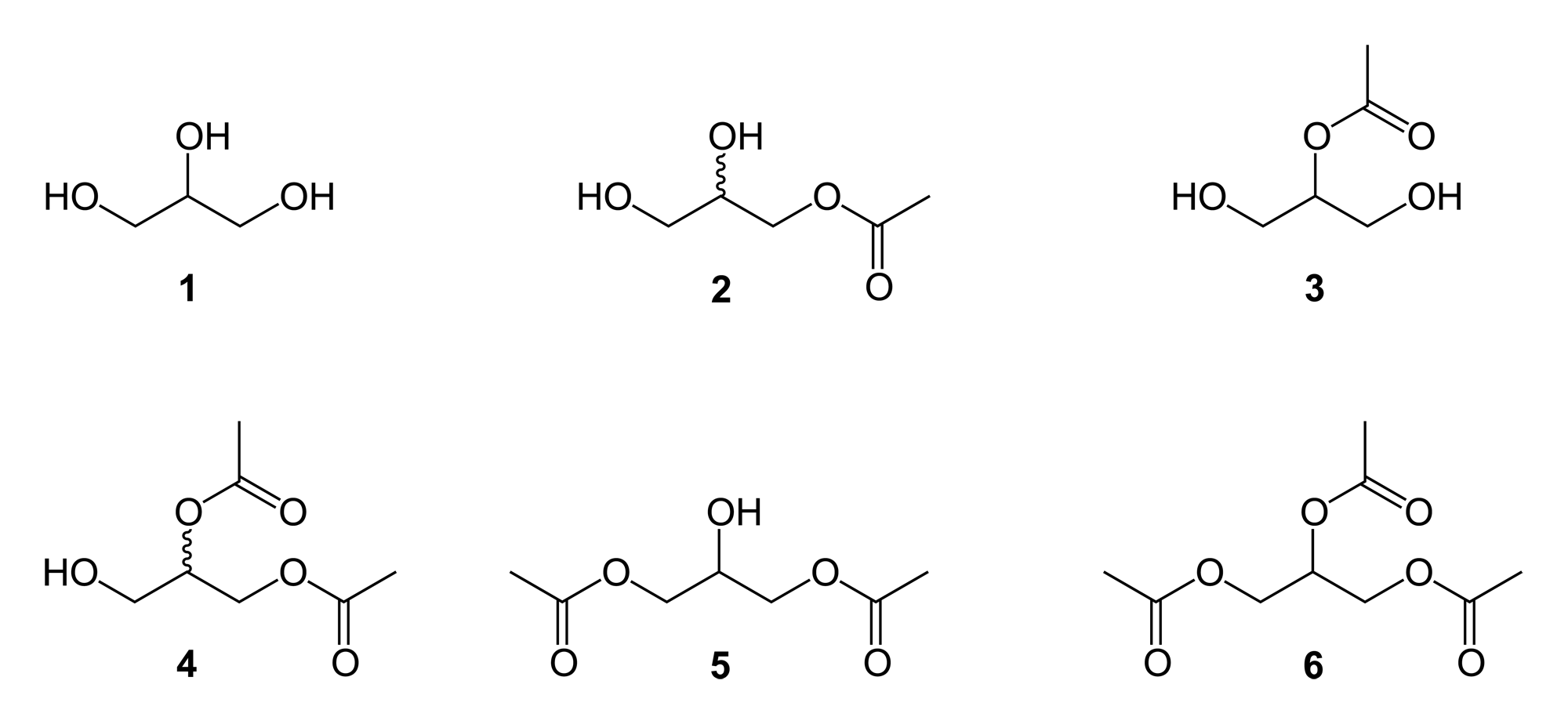
Diagram showing glycerol (1) and all the possible acetate esters of glycerol (2-6)

In organic chemistry glycerolysis refers to any process in which chemical bonds are broken via a reaction with glycerol. The term refers almost exclusively to the transesterification reaction of glycerol with triglycerides (fats/oils) to form mixtures of monoglycerides and diglycerides. These find a variety of uses; as food emulsifiers (e.g. E471), 'low fat' cooking oils (e.g. diacylglycerol oil) and surfactants (such as monolaurin).

The transesterification process gives a complex mixture of products, however not all of these are of equivalent use. This has led to the development of optimized processes able to produce better defined products; in particular by using enzymes, reactions in supercritical carbon dioxide and flow chemistry. The production of diglycerides (often called diacylglycerols or DAGs) have been investigated extensively due to their use in foods, with total annual sales of approximately US$200 million in Japan since its introduction in the late 1990s until 2009.

== See also ==
- Hydrolysis
- Saponification
- Transesterification
