= Mono- and diglycerides of fatty acids =

Emulsifier

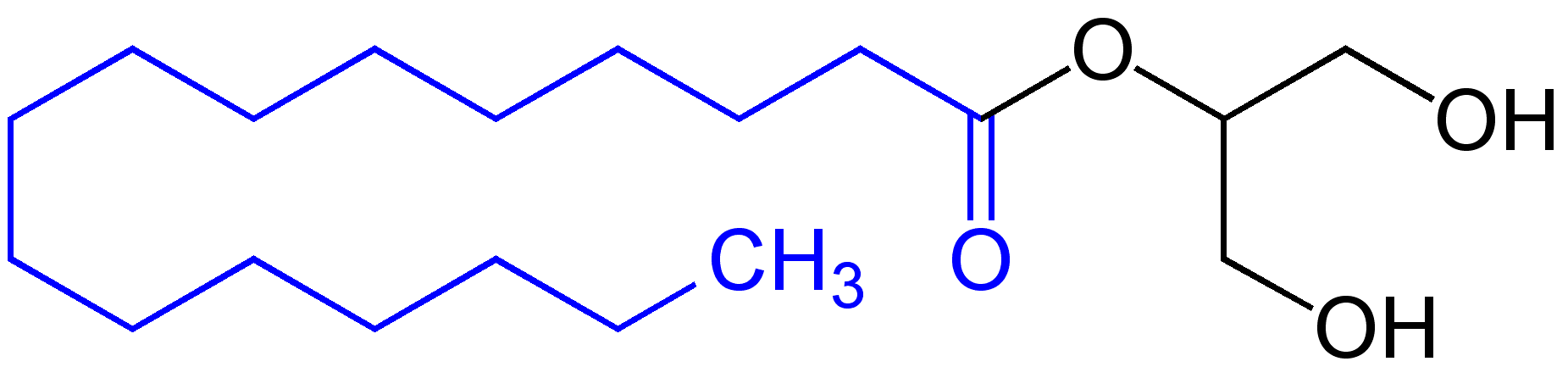
Monoglyceride of a fatty acid, in this example with a saturated fatty acid residue (blue marked).

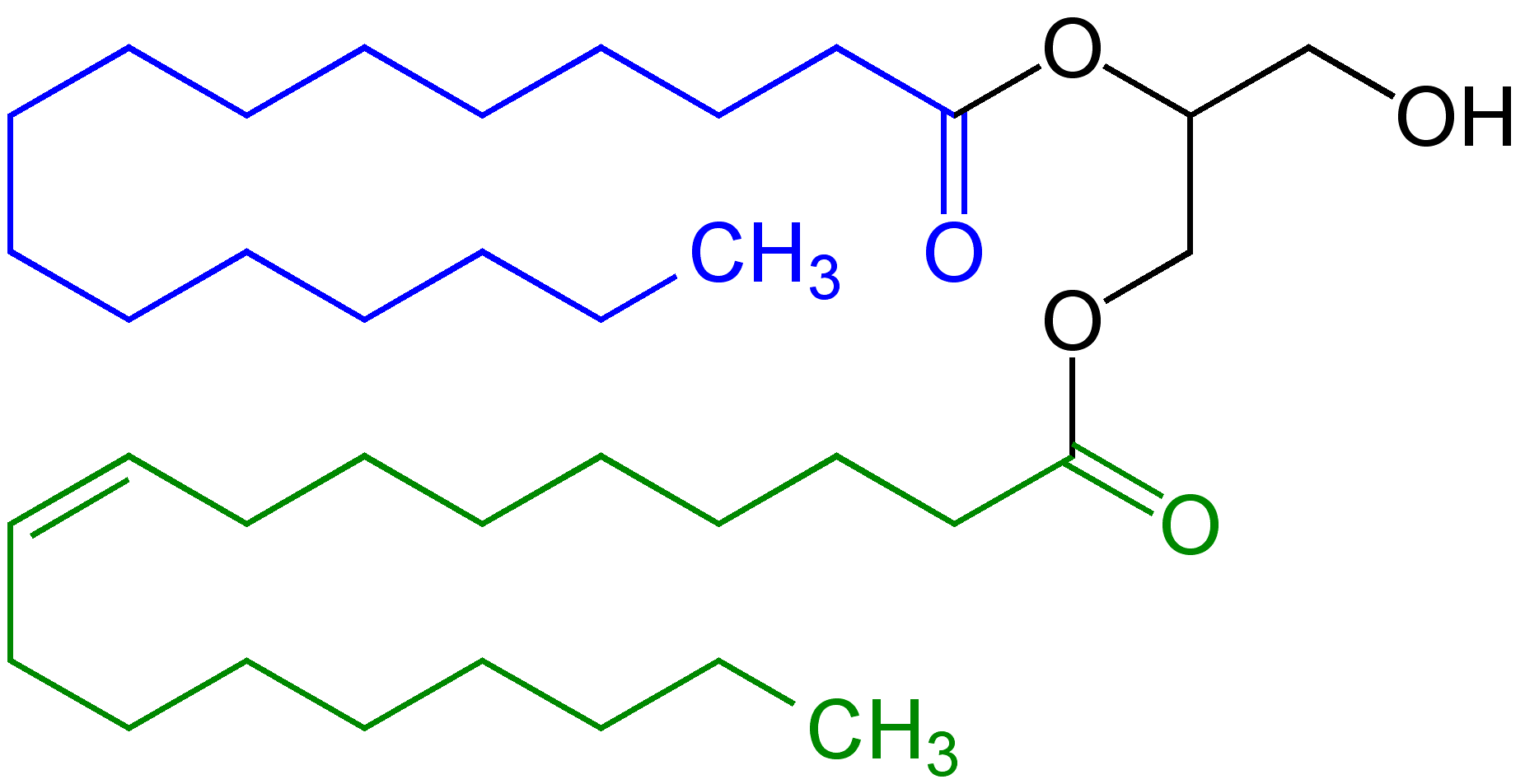
Diglyceride, in this example with a saturated fatty acid residue (highlighted blue) and an unsaturated fatty acid residue (highlighted green).

Mono- and diglycerides of fatty acids (E471) are a naturally occurring class of food additive composed of diglycerides and monoglycerides used as an emulsifier in foods such as infant formula, fresh pasta, jams and jellies, chocolate, creams, baked goods, and more. It is also used as a fruit coating agent. This mixture is also sometimes referred to as partial glycerides.

== Synthesis ==
Monoglycerides and diglycerides are types of glycerides both naturally present in food fats, including various seed oils; however, their concentration is usually low and industrial production is primarily achieved by a glycerolysis reaction between triglycerides (fats/oils) and glycerol, followed by purification via solvent-free molecular distillation. The raw materials of mono- and diglycerides may be either vegetable or animal fats and oils.

== Dietary aspects ==
E471 is mainly produced from vegetable oils (such as soybean, grapeseed, canola, sunflower, cottonseed, coconut, and palm oil) and plant pomace such as grape pomace or tomato pomace), although animal fats are sometimes used and cannot be completely excluded as being present in the product. The fatty acids from each source are chemically identical. The Vegan Society, which discourages eating animal-based foods, flags E471 as potentially animal based.

The World Health Organization's (WHO) report on the toxicological evaluation of mono- and diglycerides states that, "Food fats are in the main triglycerides. However, many of them have been shown to contain small amounts of diglycerides and monoglycerides. The amount present is commonly in the region of 1%. There is some evidence also that further amounts of these partial glycerides may be formed during the preparation of certain foods. Therefore, apart from any addition of these substances to food for technological purposes, they will always be present in the food as consumed." Mono- and diglycerides may contain small amounts of trans fat.

== Metabolism ==
Mono- and diglycerides are naturally digested as part of normal lipid metabolism (i.e., the natural digestion of dietary fats and oils).

== Effects on health ==
The safety of mono- and diglycerides of fatty acids has been assessed by several regulatory authorities. The Joint FAO/WHO Expert Committee on Food Additives (JECFA) has set an "acceptable daily intake" (ADI) as "not limited" due to the safety of these ingredients. In 2017, the European Food Safety Authority (EFSA) re-evaluated the safety of mono- and diglycerides and concluded that there is no need to establish a numerical ADI and there is no safety concern for the reported food uses.

Additionally, the Center for Science in the Public Interest, a consumer interest group that previously campaigned for the elimination of sulfite preservatives in fresh foods, as well as campaigned to label -- and eventually eliminate -- artificial trans fat (found in partially hydrogenated oils) ranks mono- and diglycerides as "safe" in their Chemical Cuisine Ratings.

A French observational study of several food additives published in 2024 suggested a correlation but not a causation between a higher intake of E471 in highly processed foods and increased risk of cancer by 15%, particularly breast cancer (24%) and prostate cancer (46%). The study also notes, that "Cancer is a multifactorial pathology, thus as expected, one specific nutritional factor (here, exposure to an emulsifier) does not drastically increase absolute risks per se."

== Other uses ==
In the late 2010s, the company Apeel Sciences entered the market in parts of South America, China, and Japan with monoacylglycerols as an alternative to fruit waxing and plastic films to prevent withering and conserving fruit and vegetables for transport and storage.

== See also ==
- Polyglycerol polyricinoleate
- Monoglyceride
- Diglyceride
