= GMHS =

GMHS may refer to:

- Glyceryl monohydroxystearate

== Schools ==
- Garner Magnet High School, Garner, North Carolina, United States
- General McLane High School, Edinboro, Pennsylvania, United States
- George Mason High School, Falls Church, Virginia, United States
- Granby Memorial High School, Granby, Connecticut, United States
- Great Mills High School, Great Mills, Maryland, United States
- Green Mountain High School, Lakewood, Colorado, United States
- Groveport Madison High School, Groveport, Ohio, United States
- Guam High School, Agana Heights, Guam, United States
