= Glyceride =

Chemical esters commonly found in fats and oils

Glycerol

Triacetin, the simplest possible fat (triglyceride) after triformin

Glycerides, also known as acylglycerols, are esters formed from glycerol and fatty acids, and are generally very hydrophobic.

Glycerol has three hydroxyl functional groups, which can be esterified with one, two, or three fatty acids to form mono-, di-, and triglycerides. These structures vary in their fatty acid alkyl groups as they can contain different carbon numbers, different degrees of unsaturation, and different configurations and positions of olefins.

General structures of mono-, di-, and tri-acylglycerides with names according to the stereospecific numbering

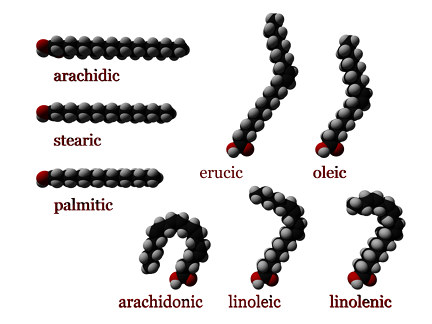
Fatty acid

Vegetable oils and animal fats contain mostly triglycerides, but are broken down by natural enzymes (lipases) into mono and diglycerides and free fatty acids and glycerol.

Soaps are formed from the reaction of glycerides with sodium hydroxide. The product of the reaction is glycerol and salts of fatty acids. Fatty acids in the soap emulsify the oils in dirt, enabling the removal of oily dirt with water.

Partial glycerides are esters of glycerol with fatty acids, where not all the hydroxyl groups are esterified. Since some of their hydroxyl groups are free their molecules are polar. Partial glycerides may be monoglycerides (two hydroxyl groups free) or diglycerides (one hydroxyl group free). Short chain partial glycerides are more strongly polar than long chain partial glycerides, and have excellent solvent properties for many hard-to-solubilize drugs, making them valuable as excipients in improving the formulation of certain pharmaceuticals. The most common forms of acylglycerol are triglycerides, having high caloric value and usually yielding twice as much energy per gram as carbohydrate.

== Acylglyceride linkage ==
An acylglyceride linkage is the covalent bond between the organic acid groups (such as fatty acid) and one of the three hydroxyl groups of glycerol.
