= DATEM =

- R = H or C(O)(CH_{2})_{n}CH_{3}

Names
- Other names: E472e; Diacetyl tartaric acid ester of mono- and diglycerides

Identifiers
CAS Number	308068-42-0
E number	E472e (thickeners, ...)
UNII	248HN3Z28U

Properties
Chemical formula	Variable
Molar mass	Variable
- Except where otherwise noted, data are given for materials in their standard state (at 25 °C [77 °F], 100 kPa). Infobox references

DATEM (diacetyl tartaric acid ester of mono- and diglycerides, also E472e) is an emulsifier primarily used in baking to strengthen the gluten network in dough. It is added to crusty breads, such as rye, to impart a springy, chewy texture. It is also used in the production of biscuits, coffee whiteners, salsa con queso, ice cream, and salad dressings.

== Chemistry ==
Although the exact mechanism is not well understood, DATEM appears to interact with the hydrophobic parts of gluten, helping its proteins unfold and form cross-linked structures. DATEM is composed of mixed esters of glycerin in which one or more of the hydroxyl groups of glycerin have been esterified by diacetyl tartaric acid and by fatty acids. The ingredient is prepared by the reaction of diacetyl tartaric anhydride with mono- and diglycerides that are derived from edible sources. The major components are a glycerol molecule with a stearic acid residue, a diacetyl tartaric acid residue, and a free secondary hydroxyl group.

Unlike other commercially used dough emulsifiers, DATEM does not form starch complexes. Its main function is as a strengthener. Typically, DATEM is 0.375–0.5% of the total flour weight in most commercial baking.

== Manufacture ==
DATEM is derived from tartaric acid and monoglycerides and diglycerides.

== Approval ==
In the United States, DATEM is ''generally'' recognized as safe by the Food and Drug Administration (FDA) as specified in the Code of Federal Regulations (21CFR184.1101).

DATEM is approved by the European Food Safety Authority for use as food additive with the E number E472e.

== See also ==
- Mono- and diglycerides of fatty acids
