= Walter Robb =

American businessman

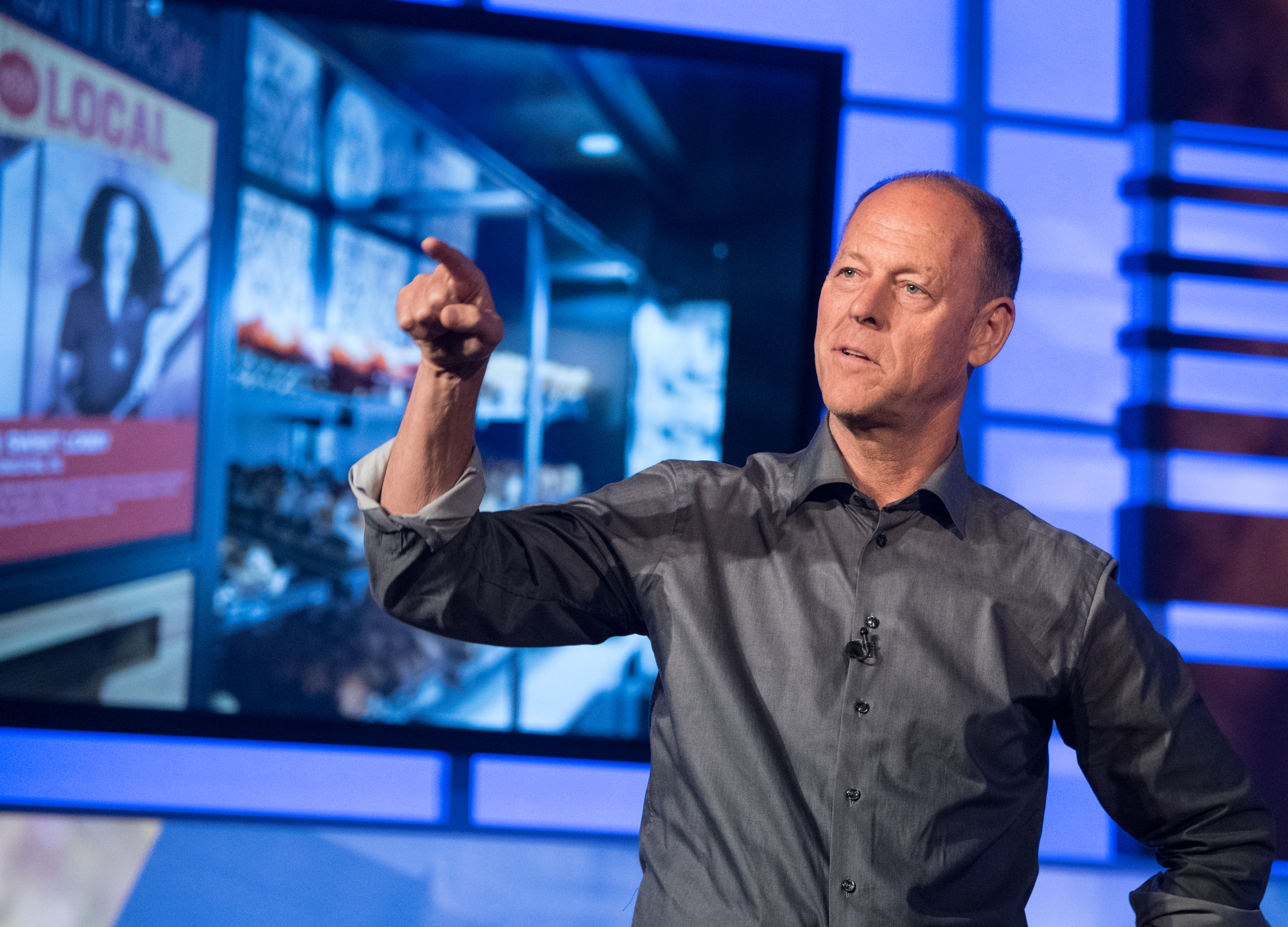
Walter Robb at the 2017 Local Foods Impacts Conference, at George Washington University

Walter Robb is an American businessman. He was the Co-CEO of Whole Foods Market with John Mackey from 2010 — at which time he joined the Board of Directors as well — through 2016.

== Early life ==
Robb was born and raised on the East Coast. He graduated Phi Beta Kappa from Stanford University in 1976 with a degree in history. He was the soccer team captain at Stanford and was very interested in ecologically healthy eating.

== Career ==
After college, Robb and his wife, Emily Wilkins, moved to Atlanta to teach high school to inner-city children. They then moved to California to work in his wife's family's almond-growing businesses. Robb started a health food store when they moved to Trinity County called Mountain Marketplace. After running the store for ten years, he and his wife divorced and he moved with his children to the Bay Area to manage a small natural foods chain. His longtime friend, John Mackey, convinced him to come work with Whole Foods. Robb started working with the Whole Foods Market in 1991 in the Mill Valley, California store that he operated. He became president of the Northern Pacific Region in 1993, building the area from two to 17 stores. In the year 2000, he became the Executive Vice-President of Operations and then Chief Operating Officer in 2001. He became Co-President in 2004.

== Board memberships ==
Robb is on the Advisory Board for the Organic Center for Education and Promotion. He is on the Board of Regents for the University of the Pacific. He's on the Board of Directors for the Whole Planet Foundation and the Retail Industry Leaders Association. He's the Chairman of the Board for the Whole Kids Foundation. He’s on the Board of Directors of cannabis giant Tilray.

== Family life ==
Robb has three children.
