= Munc-13 =

Munc-13 (an acronym for mammalian uncoordinated-13) are a family of proteins found in mammals that are related to the gene UNC13 gene found in nemotodes. This encodes a protein which complexes with RIM and likely comprises part of cellular structure which anchors synaptic vesicles. In humans, family members include the UNC13A, UNC13B, UNC13C, and UNC13D genes. Its activation by DAG seems to be important for maintaining high rate of synaptic release during prolonged repetitive stimulation.
