= Diacylglycerol oil =

Cooking oil

Diacylglycerol oil (DAG oil) is a cooking oil in which the ratio of triglycerides, also known as Triacylglycerols (TAGs), to diacylglycerols (DAGs) is shifted to contain mostly DAG, unlike conventional cooking oils, which are rich in TAGs. Vegetable DAG oil, for example, contains 80% DAG and is used as a 1:1 replacement for liquid vegetable oils in all applications.

== How it works ==
DAGs and TAGs are natural components in all vegetable oils. Through an enzymatic process, the DAG content of a combination of soy and canola oils is significantly increased. Unlike TAG, which is stored as body fat, DAG is immediately burned as energy. With DAG-rich oil containing more than 80% DAG, less of the oil is stored as body fat than with traditional oils, which are rich in TAG. Excess calories consumed by the body are converted into fat and stored, regardless of if it is consumed as DAG or TAG.

=== Study ===
According to a 2007 study, Diacylglycerol (DAG) oil is present with vegetable oil. A study in 2004 indicated that DAG oil is effective for both fasting and postprandial hyperlipidemia; according to the same study, it helped prevent excess adiposity.

== FDA designation ==
DAG oil was designated as generally recognized as safe (GRAS) by an outside panel of scientific experts, and their conclusion has been reviewed and accepted by the US Food and Drug Administration (FDA). This GRAS determination is for use in vegetable oil spreads and home cooking oil. In Japan, the Ministry of Health, Labor and Welfare has approved DAG oil to manage serum triglycerides after a meal, which leads to less build-up of body fat.

== Side effects ==
Because DAG oil is digested the same way as conventional vegetable oils, the potential side effects are no different than those of conventional oil. In addition, studies with animals and human subjects have shown no adverse effects from single-dose or long-term consumption of DAG-rich oil. It has also been found that fat-soluble vitamins' status is not affected by the consumption of DAG-rich oil.

== Research ==
Studies indicate that DAG oil has numerous health benefits, including reducing post-meal blood triglyceride levels. Clinical studies in Japan have also shown that DAG oil may increase overall metabolism, helping reduce the amount of fat already stored in the body.

However, the European Food Safety Authority Panel on Dietetic Products, Nutrition and Allergies found in 2011 that "a cause and effect relationship has not been established between the consumption of DAG oil (as a replacement of TAG oils) and a reduction in body weight".

== Sales suspended voluntarily ==
On September 16, 2009, Kao Corporation, maker of Econa Cooking Oil has voluntarily suspended sales of products containing DAG oil in Japan, which include cooking oil, mayonnaise, salad dressing, and pet food products. The company is cited as considering suspending the sales of Enova Brand Oil sold in North America. On the same day, Hagoromo Foods, maker of Sea Chicken brand of canned tuna, and Satonoyuki, maker of tofu products, have voluntarily suspended number of products made with Econa Cooking Oil sold in Japan.

In its press release announcing the temporally suspension of Econa line of products, Kao cites questions raised by European researchers on the uncertain health effect of glycidyl fatty acid esters (GE). It states that GE contained in the products are introduced as by-product of deodorization process but maintains that the main ingredient DAG (Diacylglycerol) is proven safe, and says it plans to resume sale after reducing the amount of GE introduced in its production method.
