= CADPS =

Protein-coding gene in humans

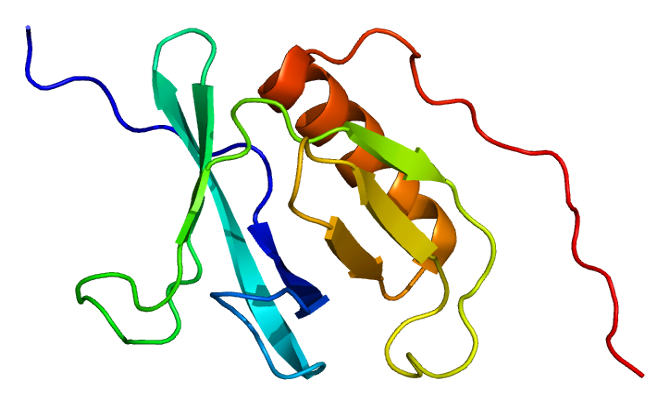

Identifiers
- Aliases: CADPS, CADPS1, CAPS, CAPS1, UNC-31, Ca2+ dependent secretion activator, calcium dependent secretion activator
- External IDs: OMIM: 604667; MGI: 1350922; GeneCards: CADPS
Available structures
PDB	Ortholog search: PDBe RCSB
PDB	List of PDB id codes 1WI1

Gene location (Human)
Chr.	Chromosome 3 (human)
Band	3p14.2	Start	62,398,346 bp
Band	3p14.2	End	62,875,416 bp

Gene location (Mouse)
Chr.	Chromosome 14 (mouse)
Band	14|14 A1	Start	12,372,563 bp
Band	14|14 A1	End	12,823,079 bp
RNA expression pattern
Bgee	Human / Mouse (ortholog); Top expressed in: pons; Brodmann area 46; prefrontal cortex; Brodmann area 9; cerebellar cortex; cerebellar hemisphere; right hemisphere of cerebellum; right frontal lobe; superior frontal gyrus; postcentral gyrus / Top expressed in: pontine nuclei; medial vestibular nucleus; dorsal tegmental nucleus; deep cerebellar nuclei; mammillary body; ventral tegmental area; dorsomedial hypothalamic nucleus; superior colliculus; medial geniculate nucleus; lateral geniculate nucleus; More reference expression data
BioGPS	n/a
Gene ontology
Molecular function	protein binding; protein kinase binding; metal ion binding; lipid binding
Cellular component	membrane; cytoplasmic vesicle; cytosol; cell junction; synapse; cytoplasmic vesicle membrane; presynapse; glutamatergic synapse
Biological process	protein transport; synaptic vesicle priming; catecholamine secretion; vesicle organization; exocytosis; synaptic vesicle exocytosis; dense core granule exocytosis; presynaptic dense core vesicle exocytosis; positive regulation of exocytosis
Sources:Amigo / QuickGO
Orthologs
Databases	NCBI: entry; OMA: entry
Species	Human	Mouse
Entrez	8618	27062
Ensembl	ENSG00000163618	ENSMUSG00000054423
UniProt	Q9ULU8	Q80TJ1
RefSeq (mRNA)	NM_003716; NM_183393; NM_183394	NM_001042617; NM_012061; NM_001359919; NM_001359920; NM_001359921
RefSeq (protein)	NP_003707; NP_899630; NP_899631	NP_001036082; NP_036191; NP_001346848; NP_001346849; NP_001346850
Location (UCSC)	Chr 3: 62.4 – 62.88 Mb	Chr 14: 12.37 – 12.82 Mb
PubMed search
- Wikidata
View/Edit Human	View/Edit Mouse

Calcium-dependent secretion activator 1 is a protein that in humans is encoded by the CADPS gene.

CADPS encodes a novel neural/endocrine-specific cytosolic and peripheral membrane protein required for the Ca2+-regulated exocytosis of secretory vesicles. CADPS acts at a stage in exocytosis that follows ATP-dependent priming, which involves the essential synthesis of phosphatidylinositol 4,5-bisphosphate (PtdIns(4,5)P2). Alternative splicing has been observed at this locus and three variants, encoding distinct isoforms, are described.
