= Tomato pomace =

By-product of tomato manufacturing

Tomato pomace is an inexpensive by-product of tomato manufacturing. Effectively, it is what is left over after processing tomatoes for juice, ketchup, soup, and so forth. It is sometimes used in pet and livestock food manufacturing as a source of dietary fiber, as well as B vitamins, Lycopene and (to a lesser extent) vitamin A. As the primary component of tomato pomace is the tomato skin, it has the potential for higher amounts of pesticide residues than tomatoes themselves. As tomato pomace tends to be about 75% water, the cost of shipping tends to be very high (due to weight). In California, where 95% of the processing tomatoes in the United States are grown, most of the pomace goes to dairies and is added to cattle feed. In the Midwest, the majority ends up in landfills. the moisture content in the tomato pomace ranges from 45% to 80% depending on the processing technology.

Tomato pomace may be the healthiest part of tomatoes.
