= Winterization of oil =

Winterization of oil is a process that uses a solvent and cold temperatures to separate lipids and other desired oil compounds from waxes. Winterization is a type of fractionation (also known as fractionate crystallization), the general process of separating the triglycerides found in fats and oils, using the difference in their melting points, solubility, and volatility.

Winterization is an oil refinement technique commonly used in biotechnology. The process involves dissolving the extract in ethanol, then placing the mixture in a freezer to chill. The cold allows for the separation of compounds by differences in their melting and precipitation points. In the cooling process, the fats and waxes with higher melting points will precipitate out and can then be removed by filtration, centrifugation, decantation, or other separation processes. A pure, liquid oil extract is left behind, ready to be further processed for consumer use.

== Bioindustry applications ==
Food products containing non-processed oils, such as fats and waxes with higher melting points, will crystallize in refrigeration temperatures. This precipitation could result in products like salad dressings separating during cold storage. Winterization is used to refine oil in salad dressings, mayonnaise, cooking oils like sunflower oil, and botanical oils.

Rice bran oil is one of the most commonly winterized oils, as it has a high content of waxes, fatty acids and lipids.

Winterization is also used in refining biofuel, as it improves low temperature flow properties. This is necessary in preventing crystallization of certain compounds in the fuel, which could cause problems with compression engines.

Winterization is also a common process in the cannabis industry, used to remove unwanted compounds from cannabis oil extracts. Winterization often follows supercritical CO_{2} extraction, for the production of cannabis oils to be used in vape pens and capsules.
