= Monolaurin =

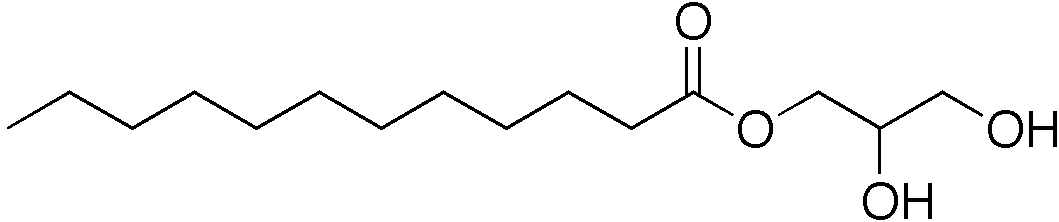

Names
- IUPAC name 2,3-Dihydroxypropyl dodecanoate
- Other names Glyceryl laurate; Monolauroylglycerin; Glycerol monolaurate

Identifiers
CAS Number	27215-38-9
3D model (JSmol)	Interactive image
ChEMBL	ChEMBL510533
ChemSpider	14181
ECHA InfoCard	100.005.024
PubChem CID	14871
UNII	Y98611C087
CompTox Dashboard (EPA)	DTXSID5041275
- InChI: InChI=1S/C15H30O4/c1-2-3-4-5-6-7-8-9-10-11-15(18)19-13-14(17)12-16/h14,16-17H,2-13H2,1H3 Key: ARIWANIATODDMH-UHFFFAOYSA-N; InChI=1/C15H30O4/c1-2-3-4-5-6-7-8-9-10-11-15(18)19-13-14(17)12-16/h14,16-17H,2-13H2,1H3 Key: ARIWANIATODDMH-UHFFFAOYAD
- SMILES: OCC(O)COC(=O)CCCCCCCCCCC

Properties
Chemical formula	C_{15}H_{30}O_{4}
Molar mass	274.401 g·mol^{−1}
Melting point	63 °C
Boiling point	186 °C / 1mmHg
- Except where otherwise noted, data are given for materials in their standard state (at 25 °C [77 °F], 100 kPa). verify (what is ?) Infobox references

Monolaurin (also called glycerol monolaurate, glyceryl laurate, and 1-lauroyl-glycerol) is a monoglyceride. It is the mono-ester formed from glycerol and lauric acid. Its chemical formula is C_{15}H_{30}O_{4}.

== Occurrence ==
Monolaurin is found in coconuts and may be similar to lipids found in human breast milk.

Lauric acid can be ingested in coconut oil and the human body converts it into monolaurin. Furthermore, coconut oil, coconut cream, grated coconut and other products are sources of lauric acid and, consequently, monolaurin.

== Uses ==
Monolaurin is most commonly used as a nonionic surfactant and preservative in cosmetics and packaged foods. Monolaurin is also marketed as a dietary supplement.

=== Food, Cosmetic, and Industrial Uses ===
Monolaurin is widely used in the food and cosmetic industries as a nonionic surfactant, emulsifier, and antimicrobial preservative. It is valued for its ability to inhibit the growth of certain bacteria, yeasts, and molds, helping extend shelf life in packaged foods and personal care products.

In cosmetics, monolaurin is commonly included in creams, lotions, and cleansers due to its compatibility with skin lipids and low irritation potential.

=== Dietary Supplement Use ===
Monolaurin is also marketed as a dietary supplement, typically in capsule or pellet form. Supplemental monolaurin is generally derived from lauric acid sourced from coconut oil or palm kernel oil.

Dietary supplements containing monolaurin are regulated in the United States under the Dietary Supplement Health and Education Act (DSHEA). As with other dietary supplements, manufacturers may describe monolaurin in terms of structure- or function-related support, but are prohibited from making claims that it prevents, treats, or cures disease.

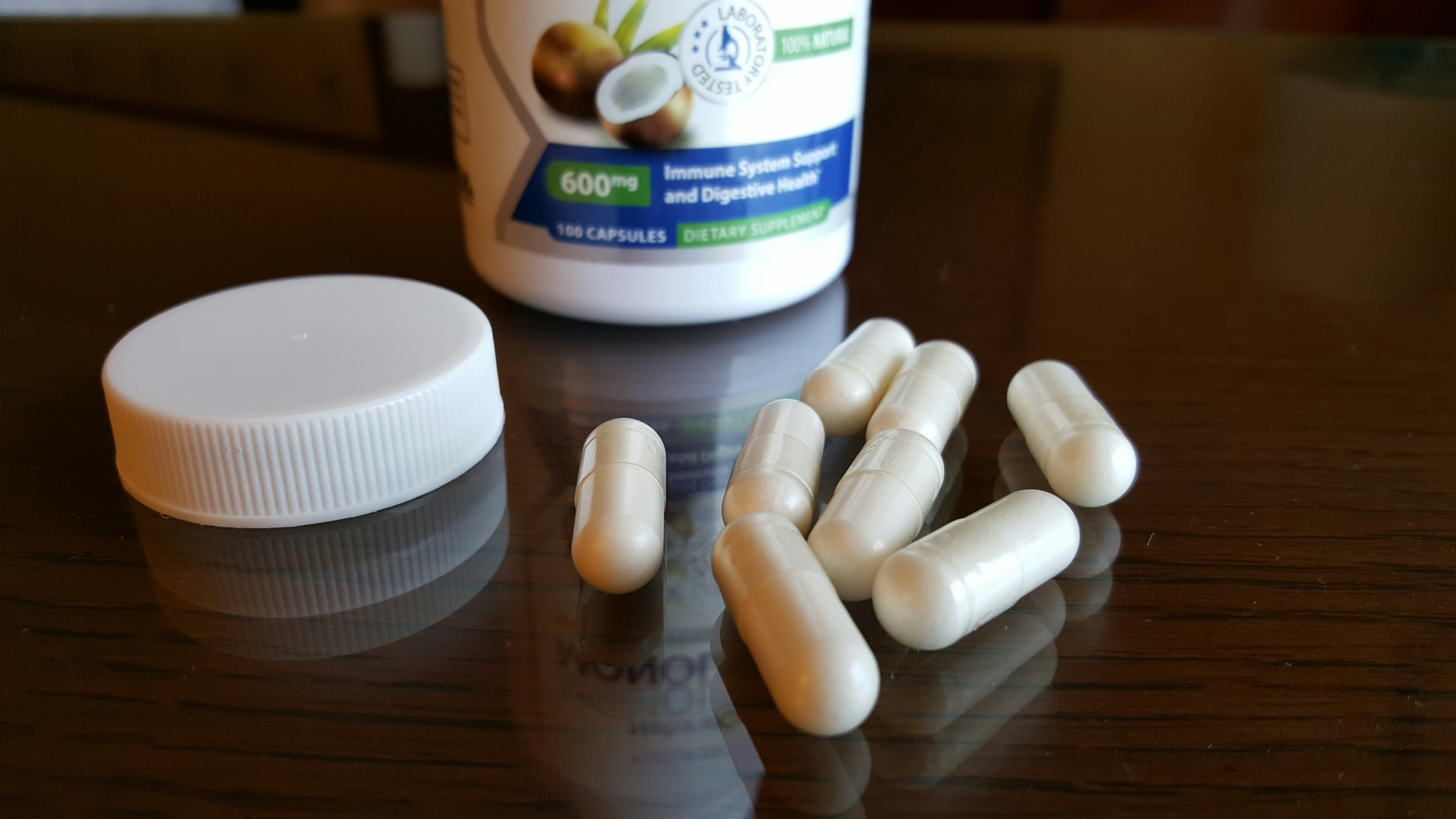
Monolaurin in capsule form as a dietary supplement

The United States Food and Drug Administration categorizes this substance as generally recognized as safe.

== Mechanism of action ==
Monolaurin is a monoglyceride of lauric acid with amphipathic properties, meaning it contains both hydrophilic and lipophilic components. This structure allows it to interact with lipid membranes.

Laboratory studies have shown that monolaurin can disrupt lipid-coated membranes in certain microorganisms, which has led to scientific interest in its antimicrobial properties. These effects have been primarily observed in in-vitro and experimental settings, and their relevance to human health outcomes remains an area of ongoing research.

== Immune system–related research ==
Monolaurin has been studied for its potential role in supporting normal immune system function, largely due to its antimicrobial activity observed in laboratory research. Some researchers have noted similarities between monolaurin and naturally occurring monoglycerides found in human breast milk, which is thought to contribute to innate immune defense in infants.

Current research on monolaurin’s immune relevance is largely preclinical, and human clinical evidence remains limited. As a result, regulatory agencies do not permit disease-specific claims for monolaurin when marketed as a dietary supplement.

== Safety and Regulatory Status ==
Monolaurin (glycerol monolaurate) is classified by the United States Food and Drug Administration (FDA) as Generally Recognized as Safe (GRAS) for use in foods and cosmetics under specific conditions. It is commonly used as a food emulsifier and preservative due to its stability and low toxicity profile.

Toxicological evaluations have found monolaurin to be well tolerated when consumed at levels commonly present in food products and dietary supplements. No significant adverse effects have been reported in the scientific literature at typical oral intake levels. As with many dietary ingredients, long-term safety data at very high supplemental doses remain limited.
