= Monoglyceride =

Class of glycerides

Molecular structure of 1-monoacylglycerols

Molecular structure of 2-monoacylglycerols

Monoglycerides (also: acylglycerols or monoacylglycerols) are a class of glycerides which are composed of a molecule of glycerol linked to a fatty acid via an ester bond. As glycerol contains both primary and secondary alcohol groups two different types of monoglycerides may be formed; 1-monoacylglycerols where the fatty acid is attached to a primary alcohol, or a 2-monoacylglycerols where the fatty acid is attached to the secondary alcohol.

== Synthesis ==
Monoglycerides are produced both biologically and industrially. They are naturally present at very low levels (0.1-0.2%) in some seed oils such as olive oil, rapeseed oil and cottonseed oil. They are biosynthesized by the enzymatic hydrolysis of triglycerides by lipoprotein lipase and the enzymatic hydrolysis of diglycerides by diacylglycerol lipase; or as an intermediate in the alkanoylation of glycerol to form fats. Several monoglycerides are pharmacologically active (e.g. 2-oleoylglycerol, 2-arachidonoylglycerol).

Industrial production is primarily achieved by a glycerolysis reaction between triglycerides and glycerol. The commercial raw materials for the production of monoacylglycerols may be either vegetable oils or animal fats.

== Uses ==
Monoglycerides are primarily used as surfactants, usually in the form of emulsifiers. Together with diglycerides, monoglycerides are commonly added to commercial food products in small quantities as "E471" (s.a. Mono- and diglycerides of fatty acids), which helps to prevent mixtures of oils and water from separating. They are also often found in bakery products, beverages, ice cream, chewing gum, shortening, whipped toppings, margarine, spreads, and peanut butter, and confections. In bakery products, monoglycerides are useful in improving loaf volume and texture, and as antistaling agents. Monoglycerides are used to enhance the physical stability towards creaming in milk beverages.

== Examples ==
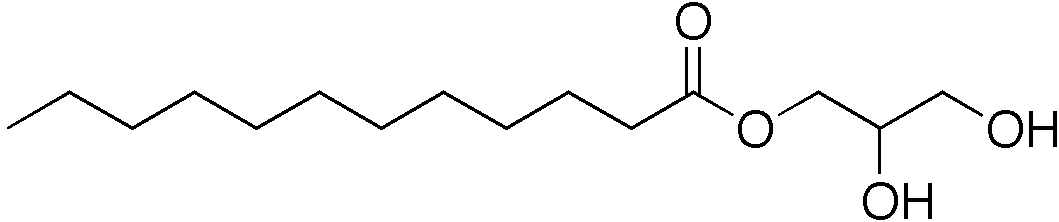
Monolaurin, commonly used in cosmetics and as a food additive

Glycerol monostearate, used in foods as a thickening, emulsifying, and preservative agent

Glyceryl hydroxystearate, found in a variety of cosmetic and skin care products.

== See also ==
- Diglyceride
- Dietary sources of fatty acids, their digestion, absorption, transport in the blood and storage
- Lipid
- Triglyceride
- Ultra-processed food
- Acetylated monoglyceride
