= Triformin =

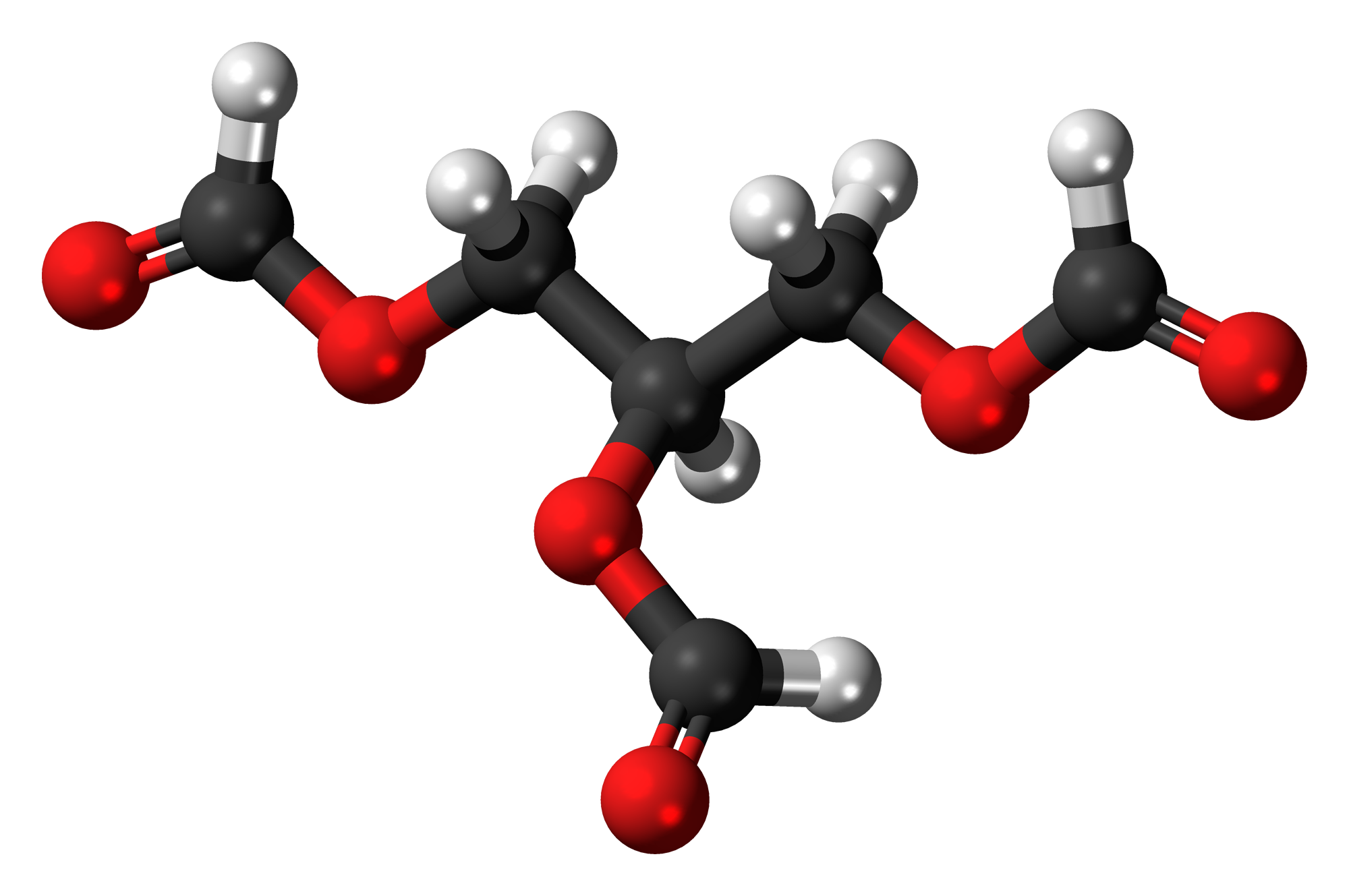

Names
- Systematic IUPAC name Propane-1,2,3-triyl triformate
- Other names: Propane-1,2,3-triol triformate; 1,2,3-Propanetriol, 1,2,3-triformate; Glycerol triformate; Glycerin triformate; 2,3-Diformyloxypropyl formate

Identifiers
| CAS Number | 32765-69-8 |
| 3D model (JSmol) | Interactive image |
| Beilstein Reference | 1769884 |
| ChemSpider | 4573731 |
| ECHA InfoCard | 100.109.163 |
| PubChem CID | 5460048 |
| UNII | 6PG7H8DN6D |
| CompTox Dashboard (EPA) | DTXSID801029629 |
- InChI: InChI=1S/C6H8O6/c7-3-10-1-6(12-5-9)2-11-4-8/h3-6H,1-2H2 Key: UFTFJSFQGQCHQW-UHFFFAOYSA-N
- SMILES: C(C(COC=O)OC=O)OC=O

Properties
| Chemical formula | C_{6}H_{8}O_{6} |
| Molar mass | 176.124 g·mol^{−1} |
| Density | 1.32 g/cm^{3} |
| Melting point | 18 °C (64 °F; 291 K) |
| Boiling point | 266 °C (511 °F; 539 K) |
| Refractive index (n_{D}) | 1.4412 |
- Except where otherwise noted, data are given for materials in their standard state (at 25 °C [77 °F], 100 kPa). Infobox references

Triformin (glycerin triformate) is the triester of glycerol and formic acid.
