= Glyceryl hydroxystearate =

- Glyceryl Hydroxystearate Chemical Structure

Names
- IUPAC name 1,3-Dihydroxypropan-2-yl 2-hydroxyoctadecanoate
- Other names Glyceryl monohydroxystearate; Hydroxyoctadecanoic acid, monoester with glycerol; Stearic acid, hydroxy-, monoester with glycerol Hydroxystearic acid, monoester with glycerol; Octadecanoic acid, hydroxy-, monoester with 1,2,3-propanetriol

Identifiers
CAS Number	1323-42-8
3D model (JSmol)	Interactive image
ChemSpider	92678
ECHA InfoCard	100.013.960
EC Number	215-355-9
PubChem CID	102606
UNII	UJ6CAW9YNV
CompTox Dashboard (EPA)	DTXSID9051666
- InChI: InChI=1S/C21H42O5/c1-2-3-4-5-6-7-8-9-10-11-12-13-14-15-16-20(24)21(25)26-19(17-22)18-23/h19-20,22-24H,2-18H2,1H3 Key: YIDBZTKQBSDQDX-UHFFFAOYSA-N
- SMILES: O=C(OC(CO)CO)C(O)CCCCCCCCCCCCCCCC

Properties
Chemical formula	C_{21}H_{42}O_{5}
Molar mass	374.562 g·mol^{−1}
Appearance	White/pale yellow powder
Density	1.007 g/mL
- Except where otherwise noted, data are given for materials in their standard state (at 25 °C [77 °F], 100 kPa). Infobox references

Glyceryl hydroxystearate, also known as glyceryl monohydroxystearate (GMHS), is an organic chemical compound with the molecular formula C_{21}H_{42}O_{5}. It is a whitish- or pale yellow-colored powder found in a variety of cosmetics and skin-care products.

== Uses ==
Glyceryl hydroxystearate is an ingredient found in some personal-care products. It is commonly used as an emollient, emulsifying agent, or bodying agent. It is often found in facial-care, foot-care, and lip-care products, sunblock, self-tanners, moisturizers, shampoos, creams, lotions, soaps, concealers, and roll-ons and sun-exposure treatments.
