= Finishing oil =

Vegetable oil used for wood finishing

A finishing oil is a vegetable oil used for wood finishing.

These finishes are a historical finish for wood, primarily as means of making it weather or moisture resistant. Finishing oils are easily applied, by wiping with a cloth. They are also simply made, by extraction from plant sources with relatively simple processing. Historically, both of these were considerable advantages over varnishes, that depended upon exotic imported plant resins, complex preparation and careful application with expensive brushes.

== Examples ==
The two most important finishing oils, to this day, are linseed oil and tung oil.

=== Linseed Oil ===
Linseed oil is extracted from the seeds of the flax plant, already extensively grown for the production of linen. The raw oil may be used, but it cures poorly and leaves a sticky surface. Normally boiled linseed oil is used. This has been prepared beforehand by boiling with lead, in the form of lead oxide, or with manganese salts. Modern boiled oils use a lead-free metallic drier added cold, such as cobalt resinate. Old linseed oil finishes yellow with age, owing to oxidation with the air. Linseed oil was also widely used for the production of oilcloth, a waterproof covering and rainwear material, formed by coating linen or cotton fabrics with the boiled oil.

=== Tung Oil ===
Tung oil is pressed from the nuts of the tung tree. Raw tung cures better than raw linseed and so it is often used in this form. As tung oil yellows with age less than linseed, it is favoured for high quality and furniture work.

=== Thinned Oils ===
Most modern finishing oils use a blend of oil and a thinning agent such as white spirit. Raw oils tend to be applied too thickly, leading to a thick layer that cannot cure effectively and so remains sticky. A thinned oil is easier and more reliable to apply. Such commercial mixtures also contain metallic driers to improve their performance.

=== Mixtures ===
There are also mixtures sold as finishing oils. These are classed as 'long oils', predominantly oil with some varnish added or as 'short oils' which are predominantly varnish, with some oil. Danish oil is a popular long oil finishing oil. Spar varnish is a short oil varnish, used for added flexibility and elasticity.
