= Grain major =

Trading companies distributing grains

The grain majors are trading companies that have a major influence on the international distribution of grains, including soybeans, corn, and wheat. In the 1990s, the five major grain traders handled 70% of the world's grain trade.

== History ==
Due to the Cold War, the United States did not export food to Eastern Bloc countries until the early 1960s. However, in 1963, President John F. Kennedy authorized the export of up to 4 million tons of wheat and flour to the Soviet Union (now Russia). In 1972, a global crop failure led to a food crisis. In the summer of that year, the Soviet Union purchased large quantities of grain from Continental Grain, including 6.25 million tons of corn and 5 million tons of wheat. Grain became known as the "third strategic material" after nuclear weapons and oil. This marked a turning point for U.S. grain exports, shifting from a desire to dispose of excess inventory to a desire to capture global markets. Major international grain companies came to be known as grain majors. In the 1980s, emerging players such as ADM and Conagra gained power.

=== Key players ===
From the 1970s to the 1980s, the five major grain companies were: Cargill and Continental Grain, and Cook Industries, of the United States, Louis-Dreyfus of France, and Bunge of the Netherlands, along with Andre-Garnac of Switzerland. Later, Cook and Garnac went bankrupt, and Archer Daniels Midland (ADM) and Conagra emerged to replace them, forming the new five - strong structure of Cargill, Continental Grain, ADM, Conagra, and Bunge.

As of 2026, the number and capacity of facilities owned by the top five American companies were as follows:

Founded	Company	Facilities	Capacity (bushels)	Net income
1902	ADM	345	444,487,959	$1.779 million (2024)
1931	CHS, Inc.	255	410,000,000	$597.9 million (2024)
1818	Bunge	80	293,006,000	$1.137 million (2024)
1947	The Andersons	77	290,000,000	$114 million (2024)
1865	Cargill	142	263,486,000	$154 billion (2025)

While all focus on agriculture and ag-business in the modern age, the companies' establishments covered varying industries at the time of their founding. ADM began as a subsidiary of Bunge. Cargill was founded as a salt company. CHS, The Andersons, and Bunge were all commodity, import/export, and storage-oriented. Based on the history of their establishment, and business development, major grain companies can be broadly categorized into four kinds of business models: "traditional trading company type," "processor type," "producer association type," and "cross-industry entrant type."

Cargill, Bunge, and Louis-Dreyfus fall into the traditional trading company type. ADM and Conagra, which developed later, primarily focus on food processing. The Farmers Export Company (FEC), a representative producer association type, liquidated in 1985 due to the impact of the US grain embargo against the Soviet Union, but agricultural cooperative organizations continue to have a major influence, mainly in sales within the United States. The cross-industry entrant type disappeared with the bankruptcy of Cook Industries.

== Past major grains ==
=== Continental Grain Company ===
Founded in 1921 as a subsidiary of the French Compagnie Continental d'Importation, it was acquired by Cargill in 1999.

=== Cook Industries ===
Founded in 1919 as a cotton merchant, the company went bankrupt in 1979 after losing a grain trading maneuver.

=== Marubeni ===
Founded in 1858 as a linen business. In July 2013, Marubeni acquired Gavilon, the third largest grain company in the United States (which had become independent through a management buyout from Conagra), and brought it under its umbrella. At one point, some Japanese media outlets even listed the Marubeni-Gavilon alliance as one of the five major grain companies. However, Marubeni sold Gavilon in 2022, and there are currently no moves to include a Japanese company in the major grain companies.

== Industry restructuring ==
Trading failures and governmental policies affected, and led to the bankruptcies of FEC, Cook Industries, and Andre Garnack. In 1977, a series of dust explosions at Continental Grain's Galveston storage facilities occurred.

ADM acquired a stake in AC Topfer, a German grain trading and food processing company in 1983, and the UK's Pillsbury Company in 1992. In 1997, it expanded its business by acquiring the grain division of Glencore Brazil, and the grain division of Brazilian food company Sadia. In 1997, Bunge acquired Cevar, a Brazilian soybean oil mill.

In 1999, Cargill acquired the grain division of Continental Grain. Continental Grain dropped the word "grain" from its name and changed its name to "ContiGroup Companies," specializing in livestock, finance, and liquefied petroleum gas. In 2001, Andre Garnack went bankrupt after a failed soybean speculation. The former five major grain companies were gradually replaced.

== Business functions ==
Before the 1970s, the trading model involved selling stocks stored in warehouses, but as large-scale transactions increased, this was no longer sufficient. The model changed to one similar to commodity futures trading , where export contracts were signed first and then grain was purchased from farmers.

Grain prices are calculated by adding a basis trading amount to the regular price on the Chicago Board of Trade. Grain trading involves price risk, currency risk, and physical risks associated with transportation and storage.
