= Thomas L. Daniels =

American businessman and diplomat

- Born: July 4, 1892; Piqua, Ohio, U.S.
- Died: May 1977 (aged 84); St. Paul, Minnesota, U.S.
- Education: Yale University
- Occupations: Businessman, diplomat
- Known for: chairman of Archer Daniels Midland
- Spouse: June Herrmann Drumheller
- Children: 2 sons, 1 daughter
- Parent: John W. Daniels

Thomas L. Daniels (July 4, 1892 - May 1977) was an American businessman and diplomat. He served as the chairman of Archer Daniels Midland.

== Early life ==
Thomas L. Daniels was born in 1892 in Piqua, Ohio. His father, John W. Daniels, was the co-founder of Archer Daniels Midland.

Daniels graduated from Yale University in 1914.

== Career ==
Daniels began his career at his family business, Archer Daniels Midland, in 1914.

Daniels joined the United States Foreign Service in 1921. He "was assigned to the American delegation to the Disarmament Conference in Washington, and later to the American embassies in Brussels, Rio de Janeiro and Rome." During World War II, he was "chief in the chemical division of the War Production Board and later as head of the Food Requirements Committee of the War Food Administration."

Daniels served as the president of Archer Daniels Midland from 1947 to 1958 and as its chairman from 1958 to 1964.

== Personal life and death ==
Daniels married Francis Hancock. They had three sons Forrest, John and David and an adopted daughter, Carol. John H. Daniels became President and CEO of ADM in 1962. The family resided at 7 Heather Place in St. Paul, Minnesota and in Gem Lake, Minnesota. He was the captain of the Twin Cities Blues, a polo team. He was the chairman of the Minneapolis Institute of Art from 1961 to 1963, and he served on the board of the Minnesota Orchestra.

Daniels died in 1977. His funeral was held at the Church of St. John the Evangelist in St. Paul, Minnesota.
