= Brightwork =

Polished and varnished wood or metal of a boat

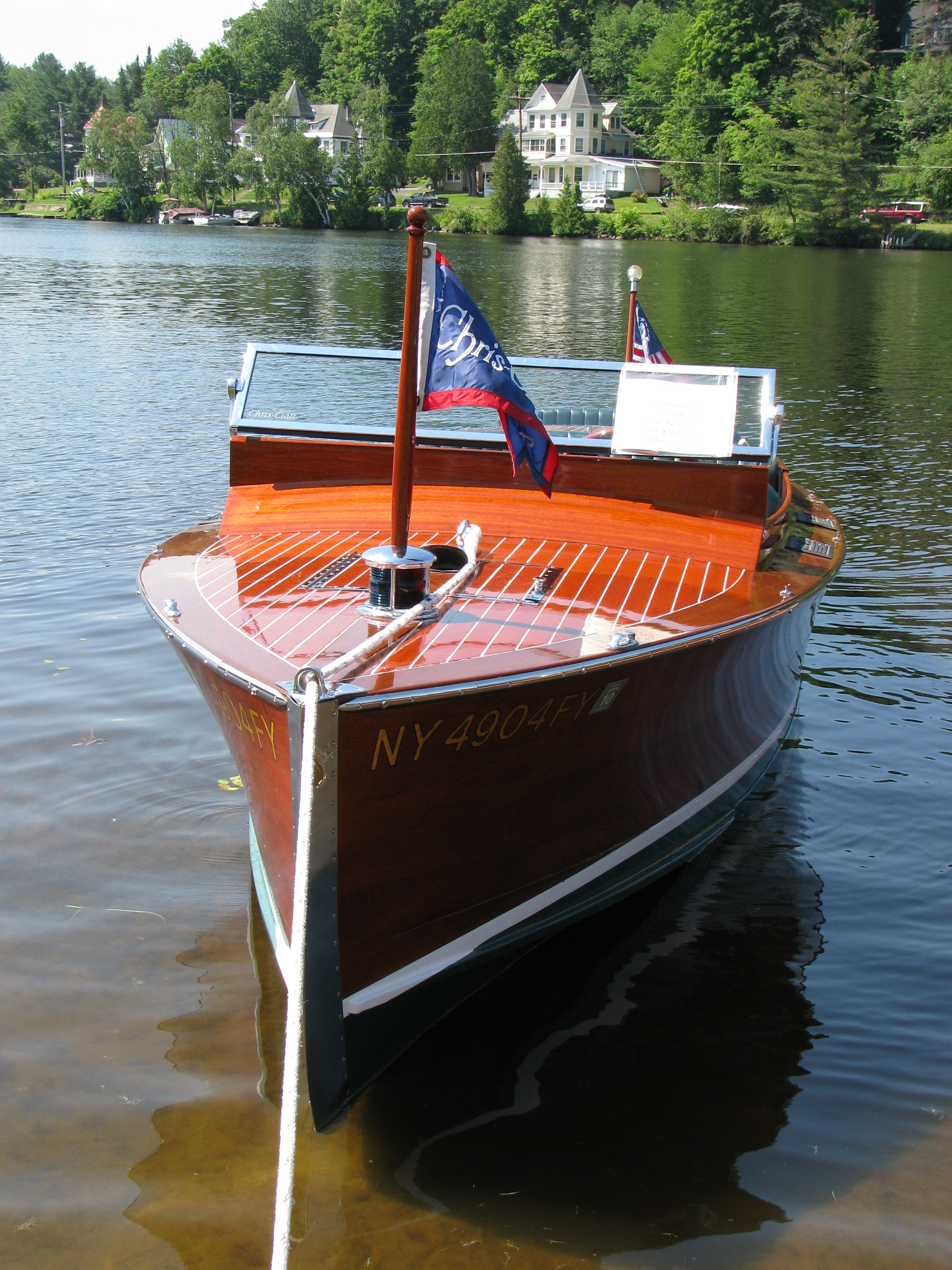
A 1928 Chris-Craft Cadet; the company is known for runabouts with extensive brightwork.

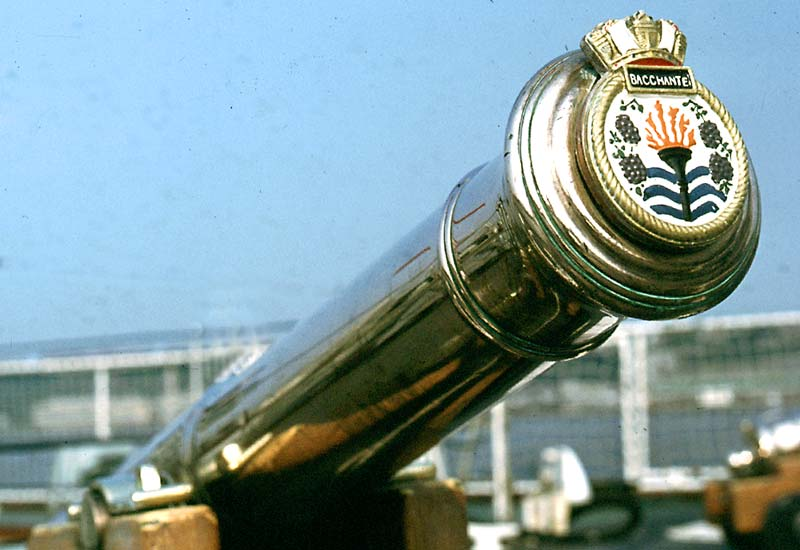
Bright brass cannon of HMS Bacchante.

Brightwork also known historically as "bright work" refers to the exposed and varnished wood or metal work of a boat. The metal is usually brass or bronze that is kept polished, or stainless steel, which requires less maintenance. In the past, due to the environmental exposure experienced by boats, corrosion and UV damage made maintaining brightwork an extremely labor-intensive Sisyphean task. However, with the development of improved UV-absorbers and filters in the chemical composition of the various marine varnishes (spar varnish, polyurethane, or linear polyurethane), this work is not as intensive as it once was. Varnished finishes are maintained by sanding and re-finishing, and metalwork is maintained by polishing.

== Popular culture ==
The demanding labor of brightwork maintenance has been a storied part of maritime life for some 250 years, since before the days of William Mountaine and The Seaman's Vade-Mecum (first published 1744). As a result, it is occasionally referred to in the broader culture. For example, in the song "When I was a Lad" from the Gilbert and Sullivan comic opera, H.M.S. Pinafore, in which Sir Joseph Porter, the First Lord of the Admiralty, recounts that he climbed the political ladder in large part by his ability to "polish up the handle of the big front door". Lord Nelson might have cast a jaundiced eye on such an attitude, but surely those brave boat owners who persevere in completing their own brightwork varnishing project will feel that they have "gained the most splendid and decisive victory", albeit one that was perhaps "dearly purchased".
