= French polish =

Wood finishing technique

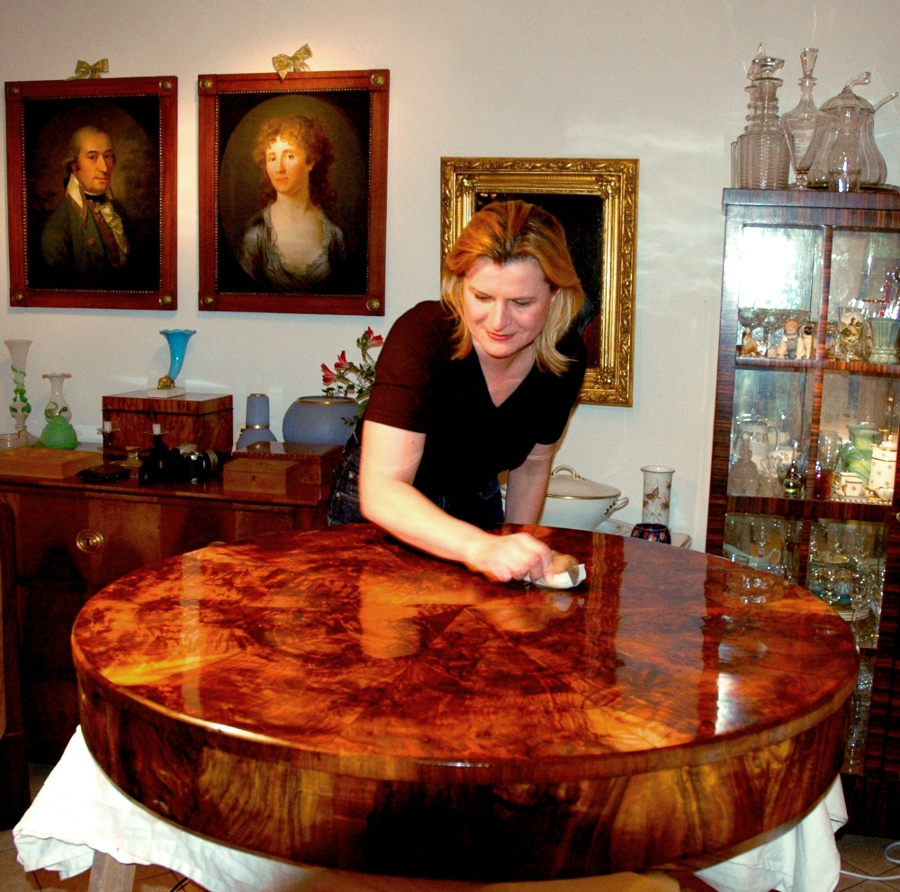
French polishing a table

French polishing is a wood finishing technique that results in a very high gloss surface, with a deep colour and chatoyancy. French polishing consists of applying many thin coats of shellac dissolved in denatured alcohol using a rubbing pad lubricated with one of a variety of oils. The rubbing pad is made of absorbent cotton or wool cloth wadding inside of a piece of fabric (usually soft cotton cloth) and is commonly referred to as a fad, also called a rubber, tampon, or muñeca (Spanish for 'rag doll').

French polish is a process, not a material. The main material is shellac, although there are several other shellac-based finishes, not all of which classify as French polishing.

The French polish technique is an effective method to accent exotic wood grain. The finish is softer than modern varnishes and lacquers, but is particularly sensitive to spills of water or alcohol, which may produce white cloudy marks, as does heat damage. On the other hand, French polish is simpler to repair, as opposed to other traditional and modern varnish finishes.

== History ==
French polishing was developed as a finishing technique in the early 19th century. In the Victorian era, French polishing was commonly used on mahogany and other expensive timbers. It was considered the best finish for fine furniture and string instruments such as pianos and guitars. The process was very labour-intensive, and many manufacturers abandoned the technique around 1930, preferring the cheaper and quicker techniques of spray finishing nitrocellulose lacquer and abrasive buffing. In Britain, instead of abrasive buffing, a pad of pullover is used in much the same way as traditional French polishing. This slightly melts the sprayed surface and has the effect of filling the grain and burnishing at the same time to leave a 'French polished' look.

Another reason shellac fell from favour is its tendency to melt under low heat; for example, hot cups can leave marks on it. However, French polish is far more forgiving than any other finish in the sense that, unlike lacquers, it can be easily repaired.

== Process ==
The process is lengthy and very repetitive. There are also many similar variations in schedule and technique. What is described here is one of them. The finish is obtained through a specific combination of different rubbing motions (generally circles and figure-eights), waiting for considerable time, building up layers of polish and then spiriting off any streaks left in the surface.

The fad is first used to place a thinned coat of shellac. Once fully dry, thicker coats follow with small amounts of superfine pumice, a crushed volcanic glass. The pumice acts both as a fine abrasive and to fill the pores of open-grain woods. It becomes transparent when saturated with the shellac, providing the deep gleam that brings out the wood's grain. Pumice tends to be messy to work with though and many modern woodworkers simply use fine-grained sandpapers (>4000? grit) to smooth off the earliest layers of shellac. The resulting shellac powder fills in the wood pores at least as well as, and often better than, pumice. The subsequent shellac coats will liquefy and surround this dust, filling in and sealing the wood pores like pumice would.

The fad is often lubricated with an oil that then becomes integrated into the overall finish. This helps to prevent the fad from lifting previously applied layers of shellac. Typically, softer/ thinner oils such as mineral oil will produce a glossier though less durable finish whereas harder/ more viscous oils such as walnut oil and olive oil will produce a more durable finish. Although boiled linseed oil is commonly used as a wood treatment, it is too viscous to use for French polishing.

There are two main variations to French polishing with regard to the use of pumice/ abrasives. In the original 'French Method', both shellac and abrasive are applied and worked together. In the 'British Method', shellac and abrasive are worked alternately.

Additives to the shellac mixture may include sandarac (sap of an African cedar) and copal, sap of a South American tree. These and other additives combined with heat and light can make the finish tougher, by cross-linking the polymers and oils in the shellac.

The piece is usually finished off after leveling (1500 grit oil sanding), then light buffing with carnauba paste wax. Too much heat or pressure from buffing will melt off the shellac and result in a bare spot that must be refinished.
