= Sterling HR-81 =

The HR-81 was an air rifle manufactured by Dagenham based, small arms manufacturer, Sterling Armaments Company.

Sterling, known for their production of submachine guns, entered the air rifle market in 1982 with their revolutionary HR81 air rifle. Designed by Roy Hutchinson (whose initials reversed gave the rifle its name) along with Peter Hart and Peter Moon, the rifle was cocked with an under-barrel lever and loaded via an unusual (at the time) bolt action breech. The breech design, whilst unusual was also the rifle’s main design fault as it restricted the rifle’s power. It was produced and finished to a very high standard using traditional production methods and avoided the use of plastics or synthetic parts. Available only in .22 calibre and costing approximately £120 upon release, it was one of the more expensive air rifles available on the market at the time.

A deluxe version, the HR-83 was introduced at the end of 1983, this differed from the HR-81 in having a fine oil-finished walnut stock with hand cut chequering, sling swivels, a more secure underlever release catch and a removable foresight. Early samples had a more complicated trigger mechanism, but this proved troublesome and few if any were released for sale. Once again, the level of finish was especially high and this was reflected in the retail price of approximately £195. It is thought that as few as 200 of this model were made (198 right hand and 2 left hand samples). Sales were very limited and the anticipated .177 and .20 calibre models were never introduced.

Production ended during 1984 and Sterling was sold on 1 January 1985. The new owners had no interest in air rifle production and production never resumed. Sterling was again sold in 1989 to British Aerospace and, after the assets were stripped, ceased trading.

In 1988 the rights to the designs were purchased by Benjamin-Sheridan and the HR-81 and HR-83 then enjoyed limited production in the USA. The American model differed from the UK model in that the rearsight, which was moved rearwards to become a removable part, was mounted on the scope rail, and the stock had a noticeably different shape. These versions were available in .177, .22 and .20 calibres. Production ceased in 1994 when Benjamin-Sheridan was bought out by Crosman.
