= Alfred Toepfer =

German entrepreneur and philanthropist (1894–1993)

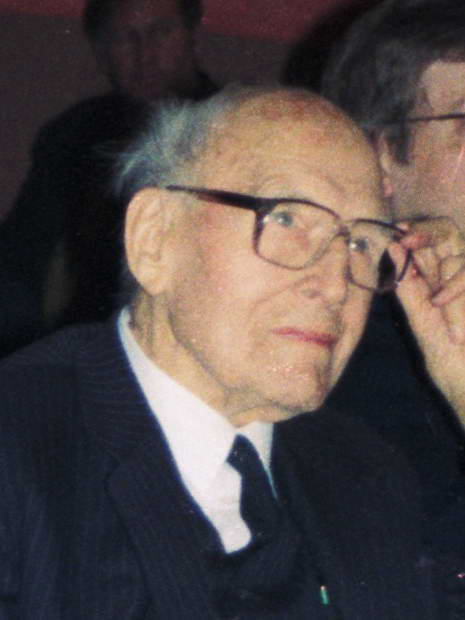
- Alfred Toepfer (1990)
- Born: 13 July 1894; Hamburg, German Empire
- Died: 8 October 1993 (aged 99); Hamburg, Germany
- Occupations: Businessman, philanthropist

Alfred Carl Toepfer (13 July 1894 in Hamburg – 8 October 1993 in Hamburg) was a German entrepreneur, owner of the company Toepfer International and founder of the Alfred Toepfer Foundation. He helped to shape the original internal markets of the European Coal and Steel Community, and was a philanthropist known for his celebration of the arts, sciences, and nature.

== Early life ==
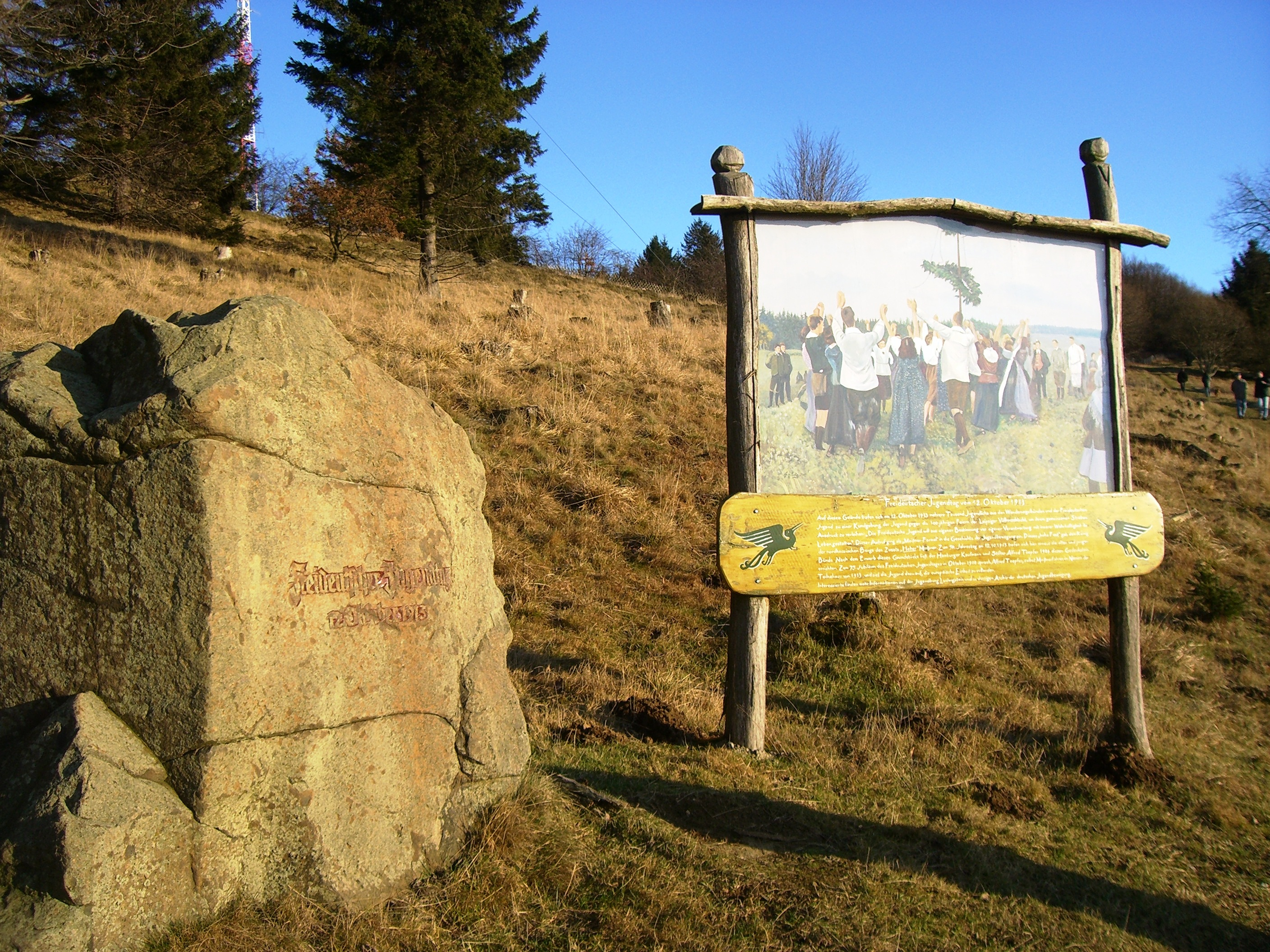
Site of the Free German Youth Day in 1913 which Toepfer attended. After acquiring the land, in 1963 Toepfer held an anniversary marking the event, and at the 75th anniversary in 1988, encouraged the youth to embrace European unity.

Toepfer was born in 1894 in Lüneburg Heath, the son of a merchant. He lived on a farm and completed an apprenticeship while learning several languages at school. Early 1912, he joined the Wandervogel, and was greatly influenced by the historian Julius Langbehn. Its leader Hans Breuer shaped his thinking, especially his call for reflection on one's own folklore. In 1913 Toepfer was one of the participants in the meeting of the first Free German Youth Day.

=== World War I ===
The following year he joined the Army as an infantryman, serving in World War I and participating in the Battle of Masurian, the Second Battle of Ypres, the Battle of the Somme, and the Fourth Battle of Ypres. He was wounded several times and in January 1919 was discharged a highly decorated lieutenant.

=== Freikorps ===
The year Toepfer left the military he joined the Freikorps, led by General Georg Ludwig Rudolf Maercker. As the leader of a mounted machine gun unit, he was first deployed in Weimar to protect the Weimar National Assembly. In the following months the Freikorps was ordered to put down Bolshevik insurrections, including in Halle, Magdeburg, Brunswick, Gotha, Erfurt and Eisenach. With the integration of the country's fighter forces in the Reichswehr, Toepfer left the Korps by the end of the year.

== Alfred C. Toepfer Company ==
Back in Hamburg, he founded the trading company Alfred C. Toepfer Company, registered in January 1920. Specializing in agricultural products, particularly grain, and his company grew globally with trade to the United States, Canada, and Soviet Union. He would also start a private bank and logistics operation. During the 1920s he built up a sizeable fortune which he would direct most of the profits into private foundations.

He ran the companies successfully for many years after the interruption of the end of World War II and his two-year internment. During the 1950s, he opened branch offices in the original six members of the European Coal and Steel Community, helping shape the internal markets of the infant trade zone. In 1979, Toepfer International was founded in Hamburg. He published the monthly "Market Reports."

=== Philanthropy ===
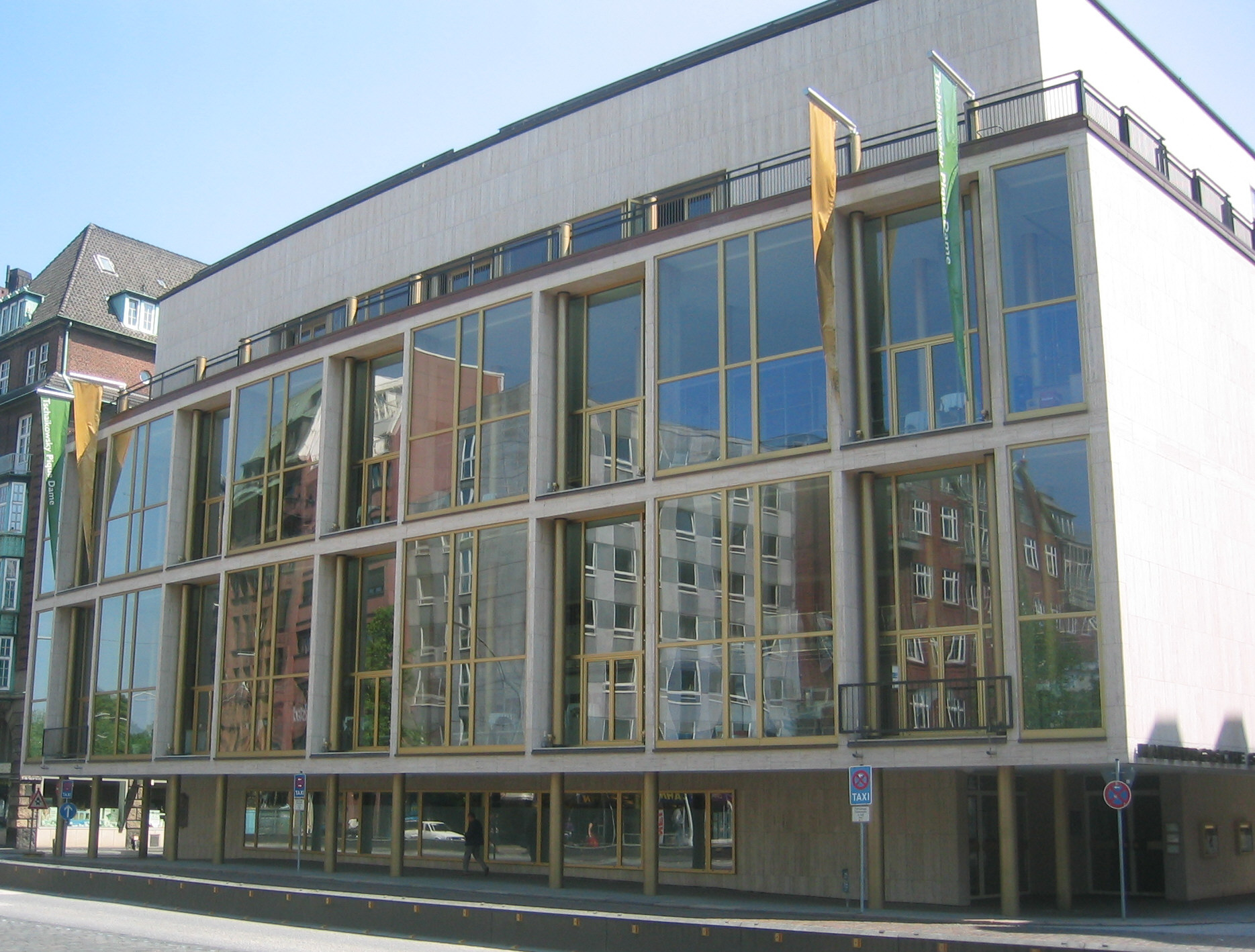
The Hamburgische Staatsoper was reconstructed following World War II with the help of Toepfer's foundations.

From 1926 Toepfer began to support youth development projects guided by the idea of national renewal after years of demoralization following the defeat of World War I. He funded the construction of youth hostels for wayfarers. Founded in 1931, the Alfred Toepfer Foundation became a primary vehicle of his philanthropy promoting the concept of European unity as well as the arts, sciences, and nature conservation. The same year he also created the Goethe Institute in Switzerland and the Humboldt Foundation in New York City, which awarded the Alexander von Humboldt Research Award from 1974 to 2004. He would also start the JWG Foundation, and in 1936 created the Hanseatic Scholarships, which allowed British students to study in Germany.

By 1973, his foundations awarded 30 cultural prizes and 75 scholarships. His European Prize for Statesmanship was first awarded in 1973 to British Prime Minister Edward Heath. Other notable awards include the Albert Schweitzer Prize for Humanitarianism, Shakespeare Prize and Herder Prize. Toepfer, a close friend of European Union founding father Robert Schuman, named a prize in his honor in 1966 called the Robert Schuman Prize.

In 1943, he commissioned Ernst Jünger's work "Peace", which was a manifest to the youth of Europe of how to proceed after the war.

In 1952 his foundations oversaw the reconstruction of the Hamburg State Opera. In 1953 as head of the Verein Naturschutzpark (VNP), he organized protests against the occupying British forces at Lüneburg Heath. His foundations purchased the Hof Möhr for the VNP, which would house nature conservations. As President of the Association of German Nature Parks, a particular concern was the preservation Lüneburg Heath and the creation of National Parks in Germany.

In the 1970s, he commissioned the renovation of Hamburg's "Old Quarter."

== Politics ==
A member of the Hamburg National Club since its founding in 1919, Toepfer was introduced to Ernst Niekisch, who published the magazine Resistance, focused on nationalism and revolution. Toepfer between 1928 and 1931 supported the magazine financially several times despite his opposition to National Bolshevism and the policies of the Soviet Union which at that time were creating a catastrophic humanitarian situation known as the Holodomor. He was also introduced to work of Ernst Jünger and his brother Friedrich Georg Jünger.

=== Nazi era ===
Toepfer was never a Nazi party member himself, and spent a period in 1937–1938 in confinement after being arrested. A supporter of economic liberalism, he never aligned himself with any particular political ideology. However, he financially supported individuals, objectives, and organisations within the National Socialist system through his businesses and foundations, moving currency through exchanges in New York City, Amsterdam, London, and Liechtenstein while avoiding regulations. They were also used for covert actions.

In 1936 Joseph Goebbels praised Toepfer in his diaries, calling him a "clever, generous and enthusiastic patron." His extensive real estate portfolio throughout Germany and surrounding countries served to host leading Nazis, including Rudolf Hess, Paul Minke, Odilo Globocnik, Friedrich Rainer, Franz Hueber, Werner Best, Werner Lorenz, Franz Wehofsich, Konrad Henlein, and Hans Friedrich Blunck, while serving as cadres and bases for operations. Many served on Toepfer's board of directors at his foundations.

His brother Ernst Toepfer was a U.S. citizen, and operated the New York branch of Alfred's business while being involved with pro-Nazi organisations in the country. He resided in Switzerland, employing Eugen Wildi of the Swiss National Front as an agent in the country.

=== World War II ===
With the outbreak of World War II, Toepfer served with the Abwehr. In July 1940 he was transferred to the control center in Paris, established in the Hôtel Lutetia. In early summer 1941, Toepfer's unit issued the "French Report," which planned the reorganization of Europe under Nazi Germany in collaboration with the French. Toepfer had contacts with French separatists such as Hermann Bickler and Olier Mordrel, whom he already knew from before the war, and would serve to help undermine resistance groups.

Toepfer, a captain by July 1942, joined the economics unit with the military commanders in France, which would employ his market expertise using him as an agent. This office was used to control the black market in the country and to procure foreign exchange by selling goods from occupied France to neutral countries, as well as secret barter for the procurement of strategic raw materials from Spain and Portugal. He was also involved in generating foreign currency.

He would use the contacts he made through these operation in the postwar period. He was able to open new branches for his company in Posen, Kraków, and Lemberg during this period. In August 1944, Toepfer left Paris shortly before the liberation by the Allies. In April 1945, Toepfer was released from military service and saw the end of the war in Hamburg as a civilian.

=== Post war ===
Toepfer was eventually captured and interned until 1947, when he was released primarily based on his arrest in 1937 by the Nazis, indicating his ability to be "de-Nazified."

Toepfer aided Hartmann Lauterbacher's escape to Argentina through a letter of recommendation in 1950, and financed the legal defence of Werner Lorenz at his tribunal. He offered employment to Hermann Bickler to help him escape the death penalty, and Edmund Veesenmayer and Hans-Joachim Riecke worked at his companies well into the 1970s. During World War II Riecke was Staatssekretär of Herbert Backe in the German Ministry for Food and Agriculture and Backes assistant to carry out the Hunger Plan.

== Legacy ==
In 1959, he was awarded an honorary doctorate from the University of Kiel.

The Alfred Toepfer Foundation founded an independent commission of historians in 1997, led by Hans Mommsen, which published a 488-page anthology in 2000 with a critical inventory of Toepfer Foundation biography and history. The commission concluded Toepfer had not shared the key objectives and motives of National Socialism, not even anti-Semitism, and was not enriched by the war.

In 2007 Hans Mommsen praised Toepfer as an exemplary European. He was in accord with the establishment of West Germany, having close contact with leading representatives. The Alfred Toepfer Academy for Nature Conservation was founded in 1981 as part of Lower Saxony's Ministry of Environment.

Toepfer once said “after the terrible World Wars with the enormous sacrifices of human life and material loss, I am committed to European unity, the promotion of peace, general welfare and to cultural development.”
