= Spar varnish =

Wood-finishing varnish

Spar varnish (occasionally also called boat varnish or yacht varnish) is a wood-finishing varnish, originally developed for coating the spars of sailing ships, which formed part of the masts and rigging. These had to withstand rough conditions, being flexed by the wind loads they supported, attacked by sea and bad weather, and suffering from UV degradation from long-term exposure to sunlight.

The most important condition for such varnishes was resistance to flexing. This required a varnish that was flexible and elastic. Without elasticity, the varnish would soon crack, allowing water to penetrate the wood beneath. Prior to the development of modern polymer chemistry, varnish production was rudimentary. Originally, spar varnish was a "long oil" varnish, composed primarily of drying oil with a small proportion of resin, usually boiled linseed oil and rosin. This gave flexibility, even though its weather resistance was still poor, and thus re-coating was required relatively frequently.

In modern times, "spar varnish" has become a genericised term in North America for any outdoor wood finish. Owing to modern varnish materials, their weather and UV resistance is likely to be good, but the original requirement for flexibility has largely been forgotten. A common form of modern spar varnish is spar urethane, a polyurethane-based finish intended for outdoor use, where sunlight-, heat-, and water-resistance are desirable qualities.

== See also ==
- Danish oil
- Construction adhesive, a gluing compound for wood and other materials, designed to be more flexible than brittle wood glue
