= American River Transportation Company =

Shipping service owned by Archer Daniels Midland

American River Transportation Co., LLC
- Type: Subsidiary
- Industry: Inland transportation
- Founded: 1971; 55 years ago
- Headquarters: Decatur, Illinois, United States,
- Parent: Archer Daniels Midland

American River Transportation Co., LLC (ARTCO) is a subsidiary of Archer Daniels Midland (ADM). It provides river transportation, including barges and a shipyard; it also operates towboats on the Illinois River, Mississippi River, and Ohio River. ARTCO Stevedoring provides bulk transfer and crane services on near New Orleans, Louisiana on the Lower Mississippi River

As of 2005, ARTCO owned 2,000 barges, and some towboats and harbor tugboats. As of 2016, ARTCO operated a fleet of 20 fleeting boats, a shipyard with five dry docks and a barge wash and repair facility.

ARTCO ships many of ADM's products, including grain and oil seed, ethanol, and corn gluten meal. Along with other goods they transport for other companies. ARTCO towboats can be easily spotted on the river, they all sport a white base coat with green and blue stripes running horizontally on the sides.

ARTCO has a presence in the Mississippi River and its tributaries, running their barging operations from Red Wing MN, down to the mouth of the Gulf of Mexico. Supported by their large parent company ADM, they have the resources to support their operations and have a reputation for safety and consistent completion of shipments. Another perk of their large ownership is their ability to be competitive with staffing their boats, with and low employee turnover than their competitors. Captains and crew alike seem to enjoy their time at ARTCO especially on the lineboats.

The company was accused of discharging oil and other pollutants into the Mississippi river several times between 2004 and 2007. ARTCO pleaded guilty to giving false information to authorities who discovered oil spill at its St. Louis facility. Two of their employees pleaded guilty to criminal charges. In April 2009, the company agreed to a $3 million fine.
