= George A. Archer =

American businessman

- Born: c. 1850; Dayton, Ohio, U.S.
- Died: November 12, 1932 (aged 81–82); White Bear Lake, Minnesota, U.S.
- Resting place: Dayton, Ohio, U.S.
- Occupation: Businessman
- Known for: co-founder of Archer Daniels Midland
- Spouse: Harriet Archer
- Children: 1 son, 1 daughter
- Parent: William S. Archer

George A. Archer (c. 1850 – November 12, 1932) was an American businessman. He was the co-founder, chief executive officer and chairman of Archer Daniels Midland. The company, which initially operated as a linseed crushing business, turned flaxseed into linseed oil for use in products like paint and soap.

== Early life ==
George A. Archer was born c. 1850 in Dayton, Ohio. His grandfather made linseed oil and his father, William S. Archer, was the owner of a linseed factory in Dayton, where he had co-founded Clegg, Wood & Co. (later known as Wood, Archer & Co.) in 1844.

== Career ==
Archer began his career by working in his father's factory in the 1870s. By 1884, he opened his own linseed factory in Yankton, South Dakota, and founded Archer & Co. Archer moved his business to Minneapolis in 1889, and sold the factory to American Linseed Co.

Archer partnered with John W. Daniels, and they co-founded Archer-Daniels in 1904. The company initially operated as a linseed crushing business. Over the years, the company expanded and diversified. When they purchased Midland Linseed Products Co. in 1912, it became known as Archer Daniels Midland. The company turned linseed or flaxseed into oil. The product, linseed oil, was used in the manufacture of various industrial products including paint, soap, and lubricants. Archer served as its chief executive officer while Daniels served as the chairman. By 1913, Archer was reported as the vice president. By the 1930s, the company had become "the largest in the world." In 1931, Daniels died and Archer replaced him as chairman of the company.

== Personal life and death ==
Archer had a wife, Harriet. They had a son, Shreve, and a daughter, Luella. They resided at Dellwood in White Bear Lake, Minnesota, and they spent their winters in Phoenix, Arizona.

Archer died of pneumonia on November 12, 1932, in White Bear Lake, at the age of 82. He was buried in Dayton, Ohio.
