= Sandarac =

Resin obtained from the Tetraclinis articulata tree used to make varnish and incense

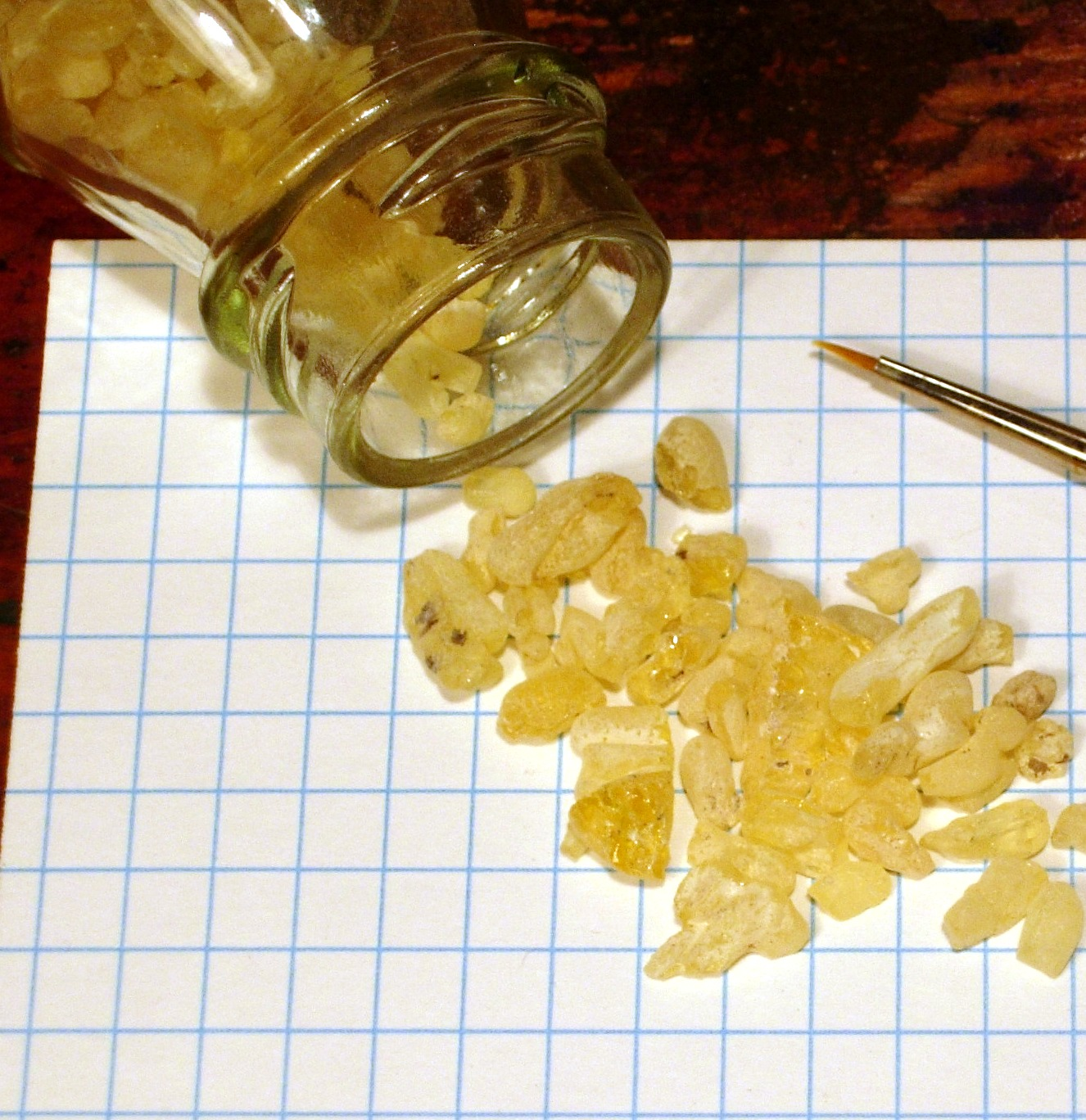
Sandarac tears

Sandarac (or sandarach) is a resin obtained from the small cypress-like tree Tetraclinis articulata. The tree, which may itself also be referred to as sandarac, is native to the northwest of Africa with a notable presence in the Southern Morocco part of the Atlas Mountains. The resin exudes naturally on the stems of the tree. It is also obtained by making cuts on the bark. It solidifies when exposed to the air. It is sold in the form of small solid translucent chips with a delicate yellow tinge. Morocco is the main place of origin of sandarac. A similar resin is obtained in southern Australia from some species of the Australian cypress-like trees Callitris, but the resin has not been systematically collected.

Historically, especially in the Late Medieval and Renaissance era, sandarac was used to make varnish. When "varnish" was spoken of in Renaissance Italy (Italian vernice) it usually meant sandarac. Copal and other resins displaced it as equally good and less expensive varnishing materials. Nevertheless, sandarac varnish is still valued today for use as a protective coating on paintings and antiques. It gives a coat which is hard, lustrous and durable. The varnish is made by melting the resin and mixing it with (e.g.) linseed oil. Sandarac resin melts at about 150 °C to a colourless or slightly yellow liquid. Its specific gravity is about 1.04.

In mid- to late-19th century photography a varnish was applied as a preservative to photographic negatives and positives. Sandarac resin was preferred by some photographers for this purpose.

Although it is not very strongly aromatic, sandarac resin was and is also used as incense. The aroma has been compared to balsam.

== Other uses ==
The ancient Greeks and Romans used the word sandarac to refer to arsenic sulfide, particularly red arsenic sulfide. In Medieval Latin, the term sandaraca meant red lead as well as red arsenic sulfide. The word's "resin/varnish" meaning came to Europe from Arabic in the early 16th century. To distinguish this meaning from the Greek and medieval Latin meaning, it was occasionally called "Arabian sandarac" or "sandaracha Arabum" in Neo-Latin writings.

The name in Pakistan and India is چندرس and, in Arabic, was and is سندروس sandarūs.

== In Mandaeism ==
In Mandaean texts, the Mandaic term sindirka, which is typically translated as 'date palm' by E. S. Drower and others, is instead identified by Carlos Gelbert (2023) as a cognate of sandarac and thus with Tetraclinis articulata.
