= Juan R. Luciano =

Argentine-American Businessman

Juan Luciano
- Born: Juan Ricardo Luciano; 1962 (age 62–63); Argentina
- Education: Buenos Aires Institute of Technology (BS)
- Known for: CEO of Archer Daniels Midland

Juan R. Luciano (born c. 1962) is a US-based Argentine businessman. He serves as the chairman and chief executive officer of Archer Daniels Midland.

== Early life ==
Luciano was born circa 1962 in Argentina. He grew up on a farm in San Nicolas, Buenos Aires. He graduated from the Instituto Tecnológico de Buenos Aires, where he earned a bachelor's in industrial engineering.

== Career ==
Luciano worked for Dow Chemical for 25 years.

Luciano joined Archer Daniels Midland as executive VP and COO in 2011, became president in 2014, chief executive officer in 2015, and chairman in 2016. He is a member of the board of directors for Eli Lilly and Company, and served as a non-executive director from 2012-2018 at Wilmar International, subsequently becoming an alternate director.

Luciano is a member of the Economic Club of Chicago, the Commercial Club of Chicago, the Business Roundtable, the US-China Business Council, the nonprofit Intersect Illinois, and he serves on the global advisory board of the Kellogg School of Management and is a trustee of the Boys and Girls Clubs of America.
