= National Linseed Oil Trust =

Former American trust company

The National Linseed Oil Trust of St. Louis, Missouri, was a major company trust formed in 1887 to protect linseed oil interests in the United States. Once used extensively in painting, the oil today is also commonly known as flax seed oil. The Trust was dissolved in 1920 after the U.S. Department of Justice charged they broke the Sherman Antitrust Act. Omaha millionaire Clark Woodman was an influential director on the board.

== History ==
Viewed today as one of many imitators of the Standard Oil Company, the Linseed Oil Trust's peers included the Cotton Oil Trust, the Lead Smeltering Trust and the Whiskey Trust. The trust was chartered in Illinois as The National Linseed Oil Trust in January 1887. In 1890, due to negative public pressure, the name was changed to the National Linseed Oil Company. At a peak in 1898, the Trust held $6,000,000 in assets over liabilities. An early report by one of the founders stated that the Trust was initially founded for the social benefit of the members.

After a period of failed speculation in flaxseed (the raw material used in the creation of linseed oil), and between August and September 1898, the capital of the company dropped from a high of $18,000,000 to $720,000. The company was rolled into a new trust, the American Linseed Oil Company. The new company was incorporated in New Jersey with a capitalization of $33,500,000 and the acquisition of 60 linseed oil factories in the country. American Linseed Oil was initially backed by a large purchase of stock from Standard Oil which increased its share of the company until Rockefeller interests controlled the trust.

== Lawsuit ==
The US Department of Justice brought suit against the Trust for violating the Sherman Antitrust Act. Several co-defendants were named, including the National Lead Company, Archer-Daniels Manufacturing Company, William O. Goodrich Company and the Sherwin-Williams Company. The suit alleged all of these companies were acting in collusion to raise prices, citing a spike in linseed oil costs between 1916 and 1918, when the price rose from $.50 per gallon to $1.80.
