= Edmund Veesenmayer =

German Holocaust perpetrator (1904–1977)

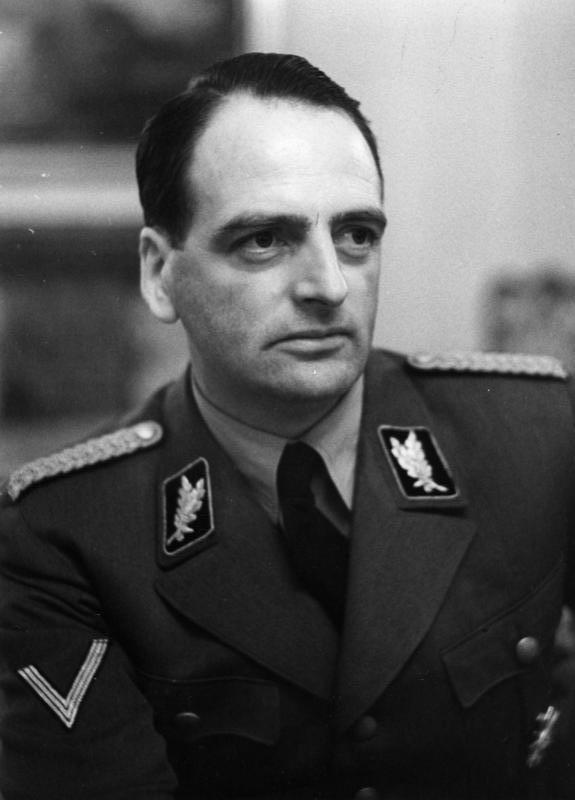
- Veesenmayer in 1938
- Born: 12 November 1904; Bad Kissingen, Kingdom of Bavaria, German Empire
- Died: 24 December 1977 (aged 73); Darmstadt, Hesse, West Germany
- Known for: His complicity in the mass deportations of approximately 300,000 Hungarian Jews
- Political party: Nazi Party
- Status: Deceased
- Convictions: War crimes Crimes against humanity Membership in a criminal organization
- Trial: Ministries Trial
- Penalty: 20 years imprisonment; commuted to 10 years imprisonment
- 'SS career'
- Allegiance: Nazi Germany
- Branch: Schutzstaffel
- Rank: SS-Brigadeführer

Edmund Veesenmayer (12 November 1904 – 24 December 1977) was a high-ranking German SS functionary and Holocaust perpetrator during the Nazi era. He was a subordinate of Ernst Kaltenbrunner and Joachim von Ribbentrop, and worked with Adolf Eichmann. He significantly contributed to the Holocaust in Hungary, in the Independent State of Croatia and in German occupied Serbia. He was involved in dismembering Czechoslovakia in 1939, in the establishment of the Ustaše-run puppet state in Croatia following the April 1941 German invasion of Yugoslavia, and in the selection and installation of the 1941–1944 puppet regime of Milan Nedić, known as the Government of National Salvation, in the Territory of the Military Commander in Serbia. Installed as the German plenipotentiary to Hungary in March 1944, he pressured the Hungarian government to cooperate in deporting Hungarian Jews to the Auschwitz death camp. After World War II, Veesenmayer was tried and convicted at the Ministries Trial; in 1949, he was sentenced to 20 years' imprisonment, but was released after serving two years.

== Early life ==
Veesenmayer was the son of school teacher Franz Xaver Veesenmayer from Oberstaufen in Kempten (Allgäu). From 1923 to 1926 he studied political science in Munich, where he received a doctorate in political science in 1928. After, he taught at the Political-Economic Institute of the Technical University of Munich for four years.

== Schenker AG career ==
Veesenmayer served on the advisory committee of the German transportation firm Schenker AG, which played a key role in moving Nazi plunder throughout Europe between 1938 and 1945.

== SS career ==
Veesenmayer joined the Nazi Party (NSDAP) in November 1932 and the SS in 1934. By 1934 he had obtained a position in Hitler's economic affairs office in Berlin. Before the July Putsch, he worked on aligning rivaling factions of the outlawed Austrian Nazi Party, forcing the resignation of Chancellor Kurt Schuschnigg, and establishing key economic connections between Austria and Germany. For this effort he was promoted to SS-Standartenführer in March 1938. His next job was dismembering Czechoslovakia and making Jozef Tiso's Slovakia subservient to Nazi Germany in March 1939. In August of the same year he worked on intelligence gathering in the Free City of Danzig where he worked on various measures designed to heighten tensions between Poland and Germany. For these efforts he was awarded the Danzig Cross Second Class. He joined influential business circles, making many friends in high places. From March 1940 to July 1943 he was entrusted with planning to move the (neutral) Irish Free State against Britain.

At the beginning of 1941 he was attached to the German diplomatic staff in Zagreb. Here, he arranged (with Ustashe leader Slavko Kvaternik) the proclamation of the Independent State of Croatia, four hours before the Germans entered the city. What Ante Pavelic meant by "independence", as Veesenmeyer reported to Berlin, was firstly to obtain German recognition of Croatia; and secondly, an opportunity to thank Hitler in person and promise him "to live and die for the Führer". Veesenmayer played an important role in the persecution and murder of Croatian and Serbian Jewry. He was involved in an operation to overthrow the Hungarian government in 1944. On 15 March 1944, he was promoted to SS-Brigadeführer and became Reich plenipotentiary after the German occupation of Hungary. From March to October the same year he was involved in organising the Final Solution for Hungary's Jews.

In a telegram dated 13 June 1944 he reported to the Foreign Office: “transport Jews from Carpathian Mountains and Transylvania space … with a total of 289,357 Jews in 92 complete trains of 45 cars”. On 15 June 1944, Veesenmayer told Joachim von Ribbentrop in a telegram that some 340,000 Jews had been delivered to the Reich. He also announced that after the final settlement of the Jewish question, the number of deported Hungarian Jews would reach 900,000.

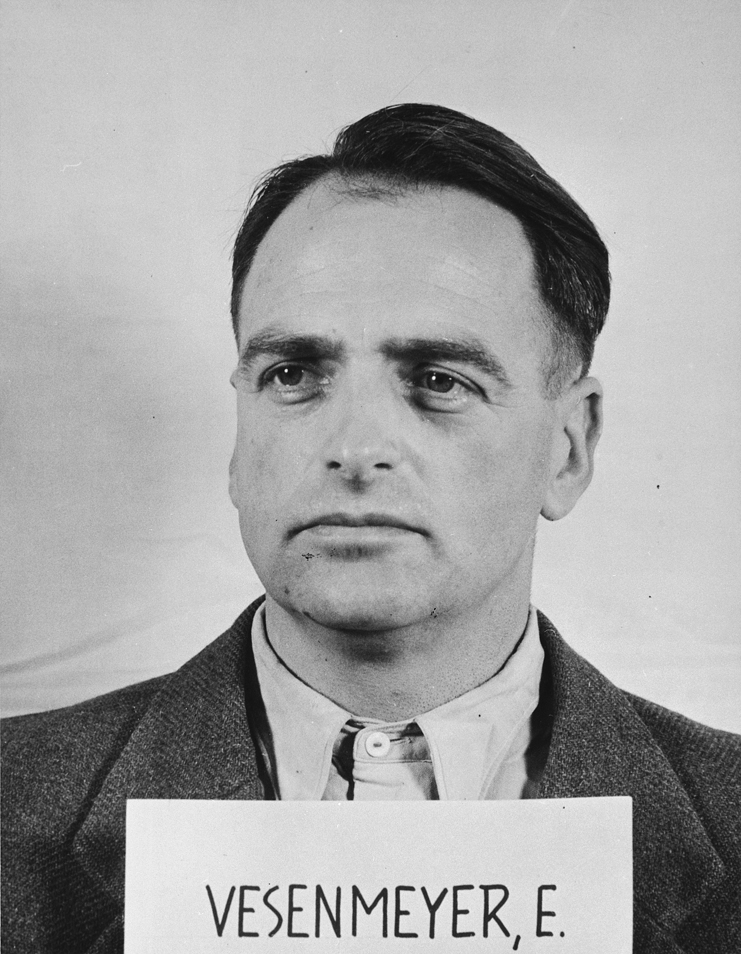
Veesenmayer's mugshot (1946)

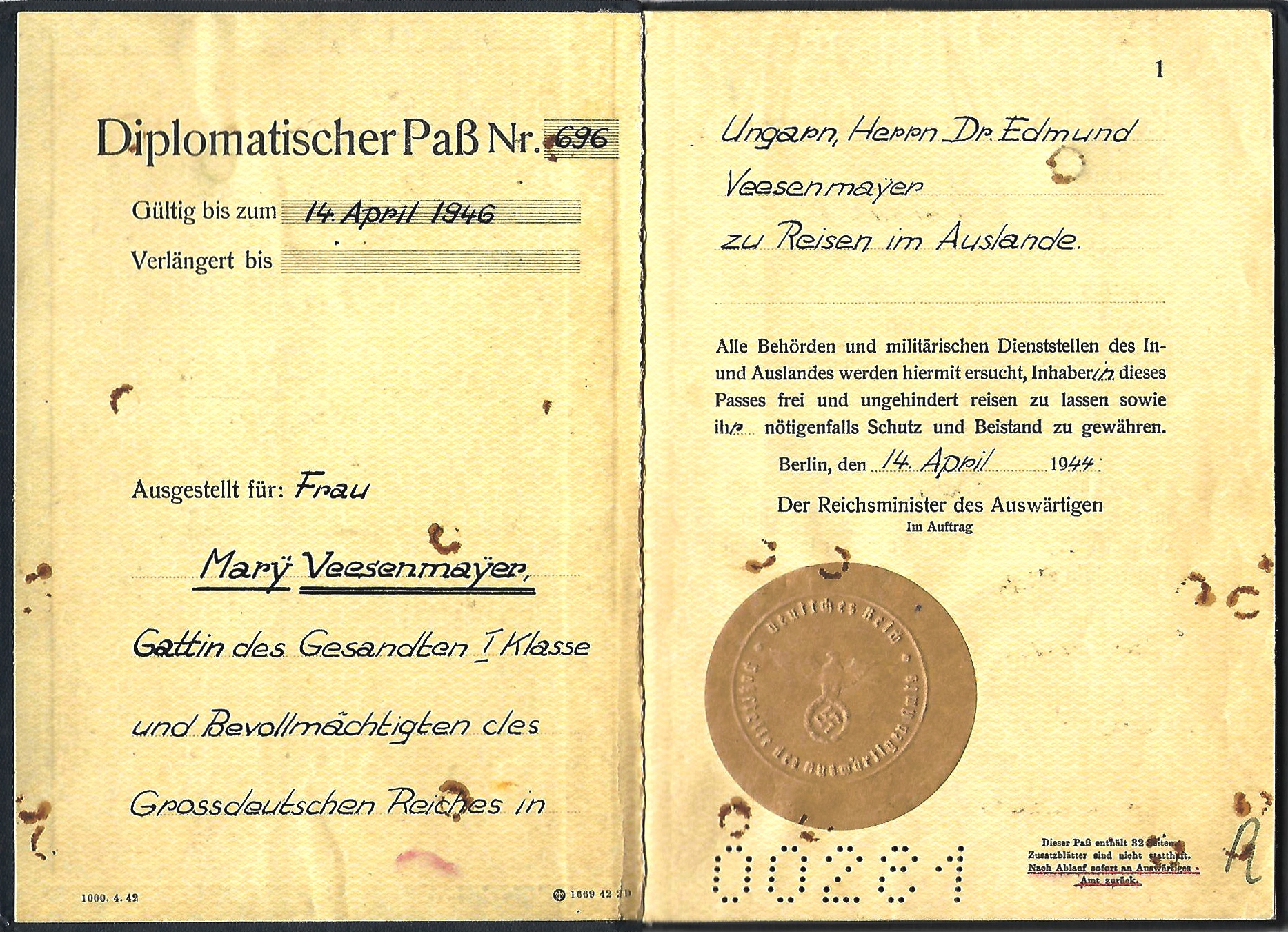
1944 German diplomatic passport issued to the wife of Edmund Veesenmayer for travelling to occupied Hungary.

== Trial and conviction ==
In the Ministries Trial in 1949, Veesenmayer received a sentence of 20 years' imprisonment for crimes against humanity, slavery and membership in a criminal organization. In 1951, that was reduced to 10 years by U.S. High Commissioner of Germany John J. McCloy under massive pressure from the West German government and public. Veesenmayer was released on 16 December 1951.

After his release, between 1952 and 1955, Veesenmayer worked in Tehran as a representative of Toepfer, a German commodity trading company. According to British intelligence, he had connections to the Naumann Circle, which aimed to infiltrate the Free Democratic Party and eventually restore Nazism in Germany.

At the end of his life, he lived in Darmstadt, where he died in 1977.

== Sources ==
- Tomasevich, Jozo (2001). War and Revolution in Yugoslavia, 1941-1945: Occupation and Collaboration. Vol. 2. San Francisco: Stanford University Press. ISBN 0-8047-3615-4.
