= John W. Daniels =

American businessman (1857–1931)

- Born: February 23, 1857; Piqua, Ohio, U.S.
- Died: June 8, 1931 (aged 74); St. Paul, Minnesota, U.S.
- Occupation: Businessman
- Known for: co-founder of Archer Daniels Midland
- Children: 1 son

John W. Daniels (February 23, 1857 – June 8, 1931) was an American businessman. He was the co-founder and chairman of Archer Daniels Midland.

== Early life ==
John W. Daniels was born on February 23, 1857, in Piqua, Ohio. He went to public schools in Piqua. After graduation he transferred from one job to another until he was 21 years old.

== Career ==
Daniels first worked for a linseed company in Piqua. He joined American Linseed Co. in Buffalo, New York and served as one of its directors. In 1901, he left and started working for Cleveland's Sherwin-Williams, which he helped become a large player in the linseed oil market.

Daniels founded Daniels Linseed Co. in Minneapolis, Minnesota in 1902. He chose the city as his business location because it was near the source of flax production. With George A. Archer, Daniels co-founded Archer-Daniels in 1904. After a full year of operation, the company reported a $72,000 profit. When they purchased Midland Linseed Products Co. in 1912, it became known as Archer Daniels Midland. Daniels was its chairman. Following the company's success in Minnesota, the partners competed in the eastern market through by expanding into New York, where they operated a linseed mill and public grain elevator that became known as the Great Northern elevator.

== Personal life and death ==
Daniels had a wife, Amelia Leonard, and a son, Thomas L. Daniels. They resided at Kenwood Parkway in St. Paul, Minnesota as well as in White Bear Lake, Minnesota. Daniels had an affinity for art and collected art works.

Daniels died on June 8, 1931, in St. Paul, Minnesota, at the age of 74. His funeral was held in Piqua, Ohio.
