= Construction adhesive =

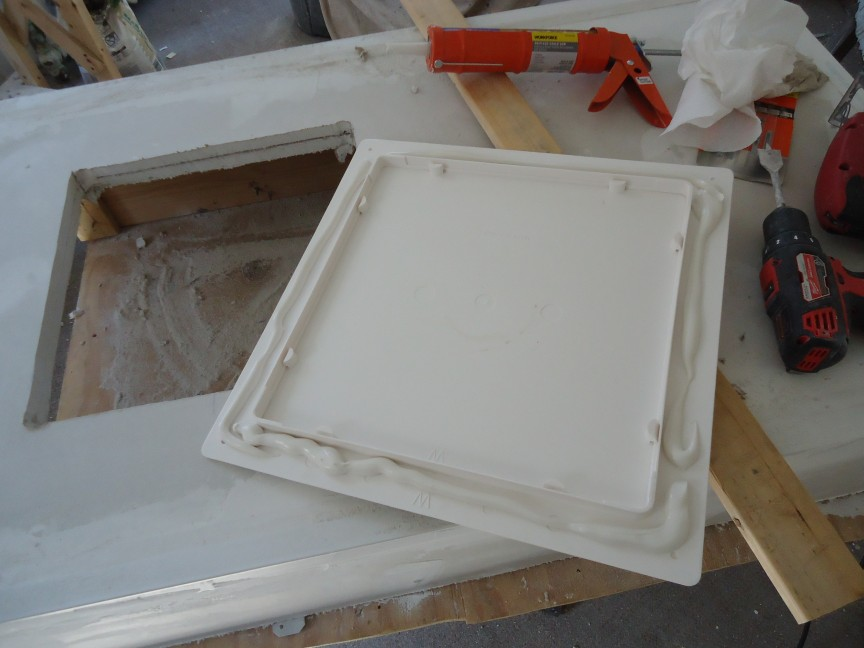
Construction adhesive being used to attach an access panel to drywall. The construction adhesive is in a caulking gun at the top of the image.

Construction adhesive is a general-purpose adhesive used for attaching drywall, tile, molding, and fixtures to walls, ceilings, and floors. It is most commonly available in tubes intended for use with a caulking gun.

== Properties ==
Adhesion to a variety of substrates allows bonding of dissimilar materials if necessary. High cohesive strength is desirable. Flexibility improves peel strength by flexing with peel stress. High elastic modulus of substrate and adhesive resists stress at the bond line.

== Composition ==
There are multiple chemistries for construction adhesives. Common ingredients include clay, cement, acrylic resin, polyurethane monomers, styrene-butadiene rubber, hexane and other nonpolar solvents, and various initiators and functional additives.

== Standards ==
ASTM C557 "Standard Specification for Adhesives for Fastening Gypsum Wallboard to Wood Framing" gives requirements for construction adhesives used for attaching wallboard in building construction.

== See also ==
- Aerolite (adhesive)
