= Varnish =

Transparent hard protective finish or film

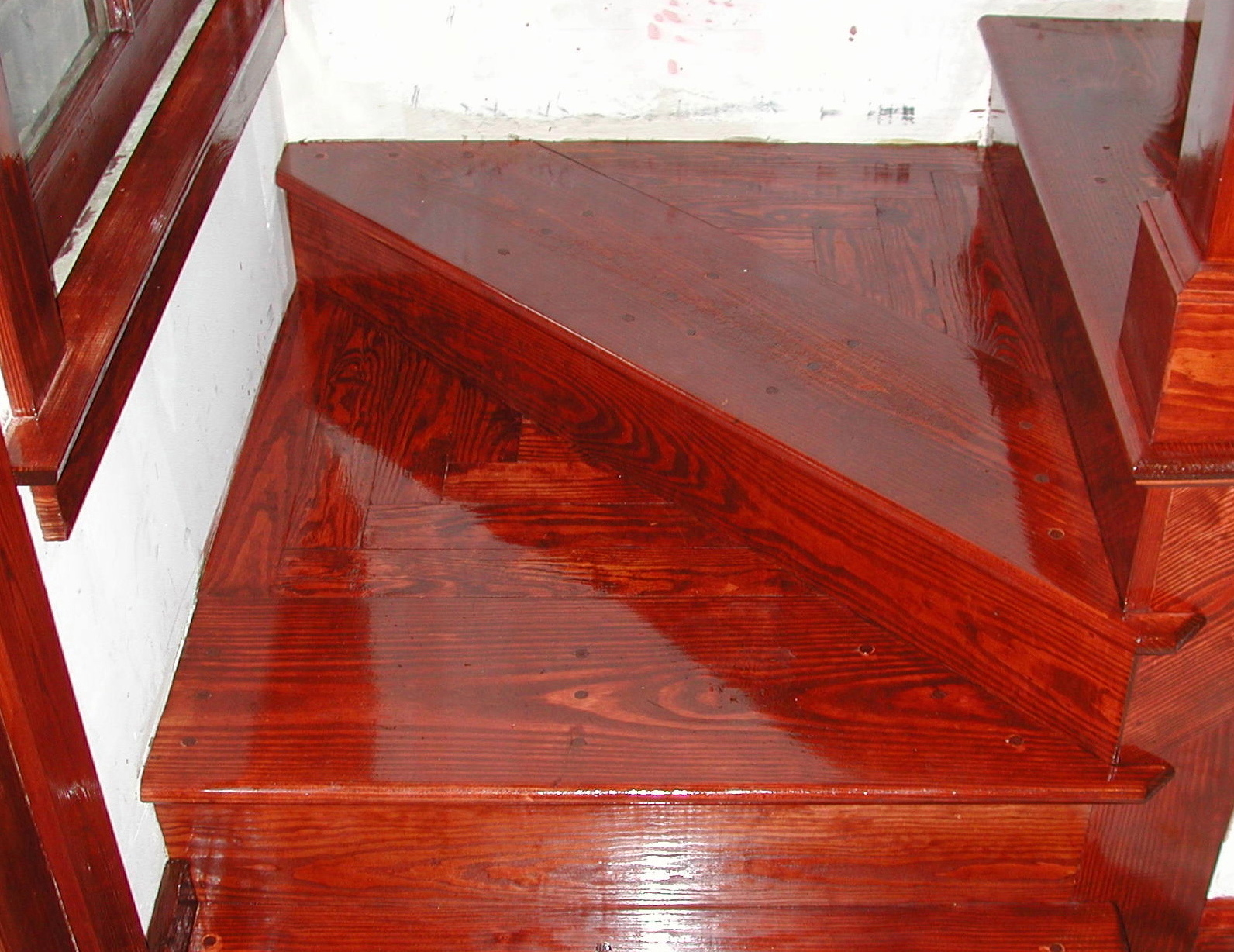
Varnish on wood stairs

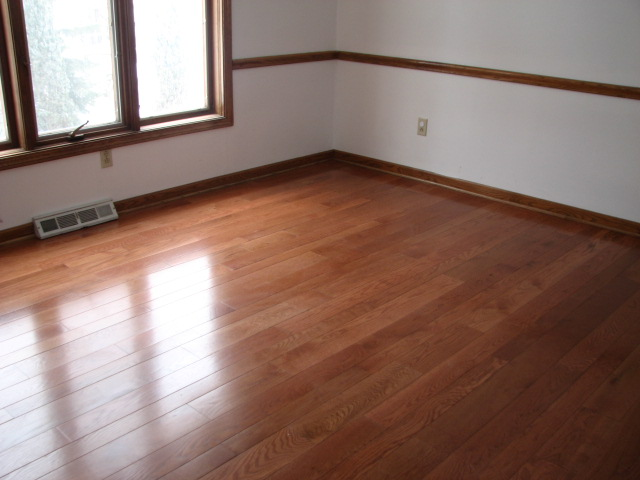
Varnished oak floor

Varnish is a clear transparent hard protective coating or film. It is not to be confused with wood stain. It usually has a yellowish shade due to the manufacturing process and materials used, but it may also be pigmented as desired. It is sold commercially in various shades.

Varnish is primarily used as a wood finish where, stained or not, the distinctive tones and grains in the wood are intended to be visible. Varnish finishes are naturally glossy, but satin/semi-gloss and flat sheens are available.

== History ==
The word "varnish" comes from Mediaeval Latin vernix, meaning odorous resin, perhaps derived from Middle Greek berōnikón or beroníkē, meaning amber or amber-colored glass. A false etymology traces the word to the Greek Berenice, the ancient name of modern Benghazi in Libya, where the first varnishes in the Mediterranean area were supposedly used and where resins from the trees of now-vanished forests were sold.

Early varnishes were developed by mixing resin—pine pitch, for example—with a solvent and applying them with a brush to get the golden and hardened effect one sees in today's varnishes. Varnishing was a technique well known in ancient Egypt.

Varnishing is also recorded in the history of East and South Asia; in India, China and Japan, where the practice of lacquer work, a species of varnish application, was known at a very early date. The Tang Chinese used medieval chemistry experiments to produce a varnish for clothes and weapons, employing complex chemical formulas applied to silk clothes of underwater divers, a cream designated for polishing bronze mirrors, and other formulas.

== Safety ==
Because of flammability concerns, many product containers list safety precautions for storage and disposal for varnishes and drying oils as they are flammable, and materials used to apply the varnishes may spontaneously combust. Many varnishes contain plant-derived oils (e.g. linseed oil), synthetic oils (e.g. polyurethanes) or resins as their binder in combination with organic solvents. These are flammable in their liquid state. All drying oils, certain alkyds (including paints), and many polyurethanes produce heat (an exothermic reaction) during the curing process. Thus, oil-soaked rags and paper can smolder and ignite into flames, even several hours after use if proper precautions are not taken. Therefore, many manufacturers list proper disposal practices for rags and other items used to apply the finish, such as disposal in a water filled container.

== Components of varnish ==
Varnish is traditionally a combination of a drying oil, a resin, and a thinner or solvent plus a metal drier to accelerate the drying. However, different types of varnish have different components. After being applied, the film-forming substances in varnishes either harden directly, as soon as the solvent has fully evaporated, or harden after evaporation of the solvent through curing processes, primarily chemical reaction between oils and oxygen from the air (autoxidation) and chemical reactions between components of the varnish.

Resin varnishes dry by evaporation of the solvent and harden quickly on drying. Acrylic and waterborne varnishes dry by evaporation of the water but will experience an extended curing period for evaporation of organic solvents absorbed on the latex particles, and possibly chemical curing of the particles. Oil, polyurethane, and epoxy varnishes remain liquid even after evaporation of the solvent but quickly begin to cure, undergoing successive stages from liquid or syrupy, to tacky or sticky, to dry gummy, to dry to the touch, to hard.

Environmental factors such as heat and humidity play a large role in the drying and curing times of varnishes. In classic varnish the cure rate depends on the type of oil used and, to some extent, on the ratio of oil to resin. The drying and curing time of all varnishes may be sped up by exposure to an energy source such as sunlight, ultraviolet light, or heat.

=== Drying oil ===
There are many different types of drying oils, including linseed oil, tung oil, and walnut oil. These contain high levels of polyunsaturated fatty acids. Drying oils cure through an exothermic reaction between the polyunsaturated portion of the oil and oxygen from the air. Originally, the term "varnish" referred to finishes that were made entirely of resin dissolved in suitable solvents, either ethanol (alcohol) or turpentine. The advantage to finishes in previous centuries was that resin varnishes had a very rapid cure rate compared to oils; in most cases they are cured practically as soon as the solvent has fully evaporated. By contrast, untreated or "raw" oils may take weeks or months to cure, depending on ambient temperature and other environmental factors. In modern terms, boiled or partially polymerized drying oils with added siccatives or dryers (chemical catalysts) have cure times of less than 24 hours. However, certain non-toxic by-products of the curing process are emitted from the oil film even after it is dry to the touch and over a considerable period of time. It has long been a tradition to combine drying oils with resins to obtain favourable features of both substances.

=== Resin ===
Many different kinds of resins may be used to create a varnish. Natural resins used for varnish include amber, kauri gum, dammar, copal, rosin (colophony or pine resin), sandarac, balsam, elemi, mastic, and shellac. Varnish may also be created from synthetic resins such as acrylic, alkyd, or polyurethane. A varnish formula might not contain any added resins at all since drying oils can produce a varnish effect by themselves.

=== Solvent ===
Originally, turpentine or alcohol was used to dissolve the resin and thin the drying oils. The invention of petroleum distillates has led to turpentine substitutes such as white spirit, paint thinner, and mineral spirit. Modern synthetic varnishes may be formulated with water instead of hydrocarbon solvents.

== Types ==
=== Violin ===
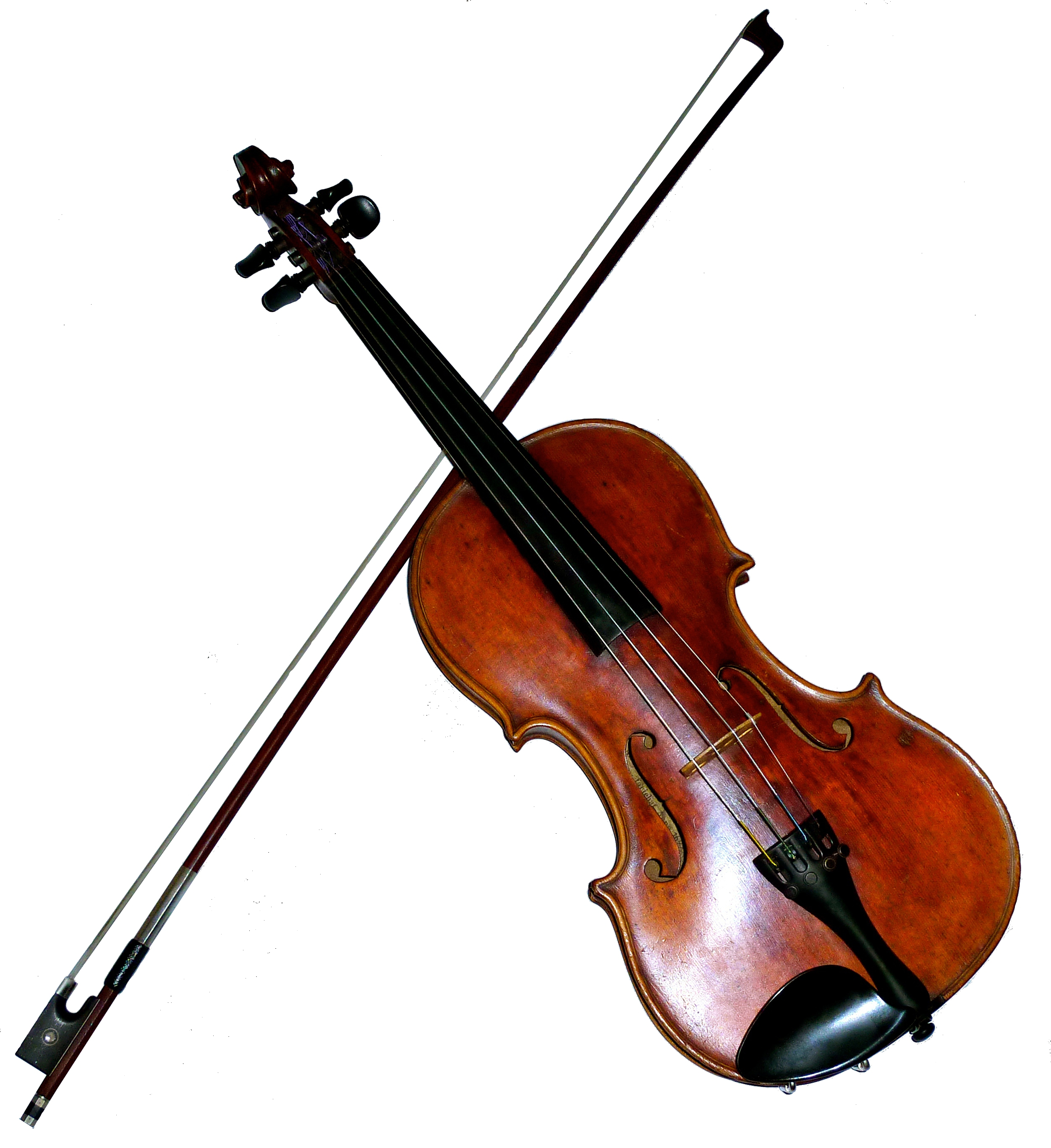
Varnished violin

Violin varnishing is a multi-step process involving some or all of the following: primer, sealer, ground, color coats, and clear topcoat. Some systems use a drying oil varnish as described below, while others use spirit varnish made of resin(s) dissolved in alcohol. Touchup in repair or restoration is only done with solvent based varnish.

Drying oil such as walnut oil or linseed oil may be used in combination with amber, copal, rosin or other resins. Traditionally the oil is prepared by cooking or exposure to air and sunlight, but modern stand oil is prepared by heating oil at high temperature without oxygen. The refined resin is sometimes available as a translucent solid and is then "run" by cooking or melting it in a pot over heat without solvents. The thickened oil and prepared resin are then cooked together and thinned with turpentine (away from open flame) into a brushable solution. The ingredients and processes of violin varnish are very diverse, with some highly regarded old examples showing defects (e.g. cracking, crazing) associated with incompatible varnish components.

Some violin finishing systems use vernice bianca (egg white and gum arabic) as a sealer or ground. There is also evidence that finely powdered minerals, possibly volcanic ash, were used in some grounds. Some violins made in the late 18th century used ox blood to create a very deep-red coloration. Today this varnish would have faded and currently be a very warm, dark orange.

=== Resin ===
Most resin or gum varnishes consist of a natural, plant- or insect-derived substance dissolved in a solvent, called spirit varnish or solvent varnish. The solvent may be alcohol, turpentine, or petroleum-based. Some resins are soluble in both alcohol and turpentine. Generally, petroleum solvents, i.e. mineral spirits or paint thinner, can substitute for turpentine. The resins include amber, dammar, copal, rosin, sandarac, elemi, benzoin, mastic, balsam, shellac, and a multitude of lacquers.

Synthetic resins such as phenolic resin may be employed as a secondary component in certain varnishes and paints.

Over centuries, many recipes were developed which involved the combination of resins, oils, and other ingredients such as certain waxes. These were believed to impart special tonal qualities to musical instruments and thus were sometimes carefully guarded secrets. The interaction of different ingredients is difficult to predict or reproduce, so expert finishers were often prized professionals.

=== Shellac ===
Shellac is a very widely used single-component resin varnish that is alcohol-soluble. It is not used for outdoor surfaces or where it will come into repeated contact with water, such as around a sink or bathtub. The source of shellac resin is a brittle or flaky secretion of the female lac insect, Kerria lacca, found in the forests of Assam and Thailand and harvested from the bark of the trees where she deposits it to provide a sticky hold on the trunk. Shellac is the basis of French polish, which for centuries has been the preferred finish for fine furniture. Specified "dewaxed" shellac has been processed to remove the waxy substances from original shellac and can be used as a primer and sanding-sealer substrate for other finishes such as polyurethanes, alkyds, oils, and acrylics.

Prepared shellac is typically available in "clear" and "amber" (or "orange") varieties, generally as "three-pound cut" or three pounds dry shellac to one US gallon of alcohol. Other natural color shades such as ruby and yellow are available from specialty pigment or woodworker's supply outlets. Dry shellac is available as refined flakes, "sticklac," "button lac," or "seedlac." "White pigmented" shellac primer paint is widely available in retail outlets, billed as a fast-drying interior primer "problem solver", in that it adheres to a variety of surfaces and seals off odors and smoke stains. Shellac clean-up may be done either with pure alcohol or with ammonia cleansers.

=== Alkyd ===
Modern commercially produced varnishes employ some form of alkyd for producing a protective film. Alkyds have good solvent, moisture and UV light resistance. Alkyds are chemically modified vegetable oils which operate well in a wide range of conditions and can be engineered to speed up the cure rate and thus harden faster. Usually this is by the use of metal salt driers such as cobalt salts. Better (and more expensive) exterior varnishes employ alkyds made from high performance oils and contain UV-absorbers; this improves gloss-retention and extends the lifetime of the finish. Various resins may also be combined with alkyds as part of the formula for typical "oil" varnishes that are commercially available.

=== Spar varnish ===
Spar varnish (also called marine varnish or yacht varnish) was originally intended for use on ship or boat spars, to protect the timber from the effects of sea and weather. Spars bend under the load of their sails. The primary requirements were water resistance and also elasticity, so as to remain adhering as the spars flexed. Elasticity was a pre-condition for weatherproofing too, as a finish that cracked would then allow water through, even if the remaining film was impermeable. Appearance and gloss was of relatively low value. Modified tung oil and phenolic resins are often used.

When first developed, no varnishes had good UV-resistance. Even after more modern synthetic resins did become resistant, a true spar varnish maintained its elasticity above other virtues, even if this required a compromise in its UV-resistance. Spar varnishes are thus not necessarily the best choice for outdoor woodwork that does not need to bend in service.

Despite this, the widespread perception of "marine products" as "tough" led to domestic outdoor varnishes being branded as "Spar varnish" and sold on the virtue of their weather- and UV-resistance. These claims may be more or less realistic, depending on individual products. Only relatively recently have spar varnishes been available that can offer both effective elasticity and UV-resistance.

=== Drying oils ===
Drying oils, such as linseed and tung oil, are not true varnishes though often in modern terms they accomplish the same thing.

=== Polyurethane ===
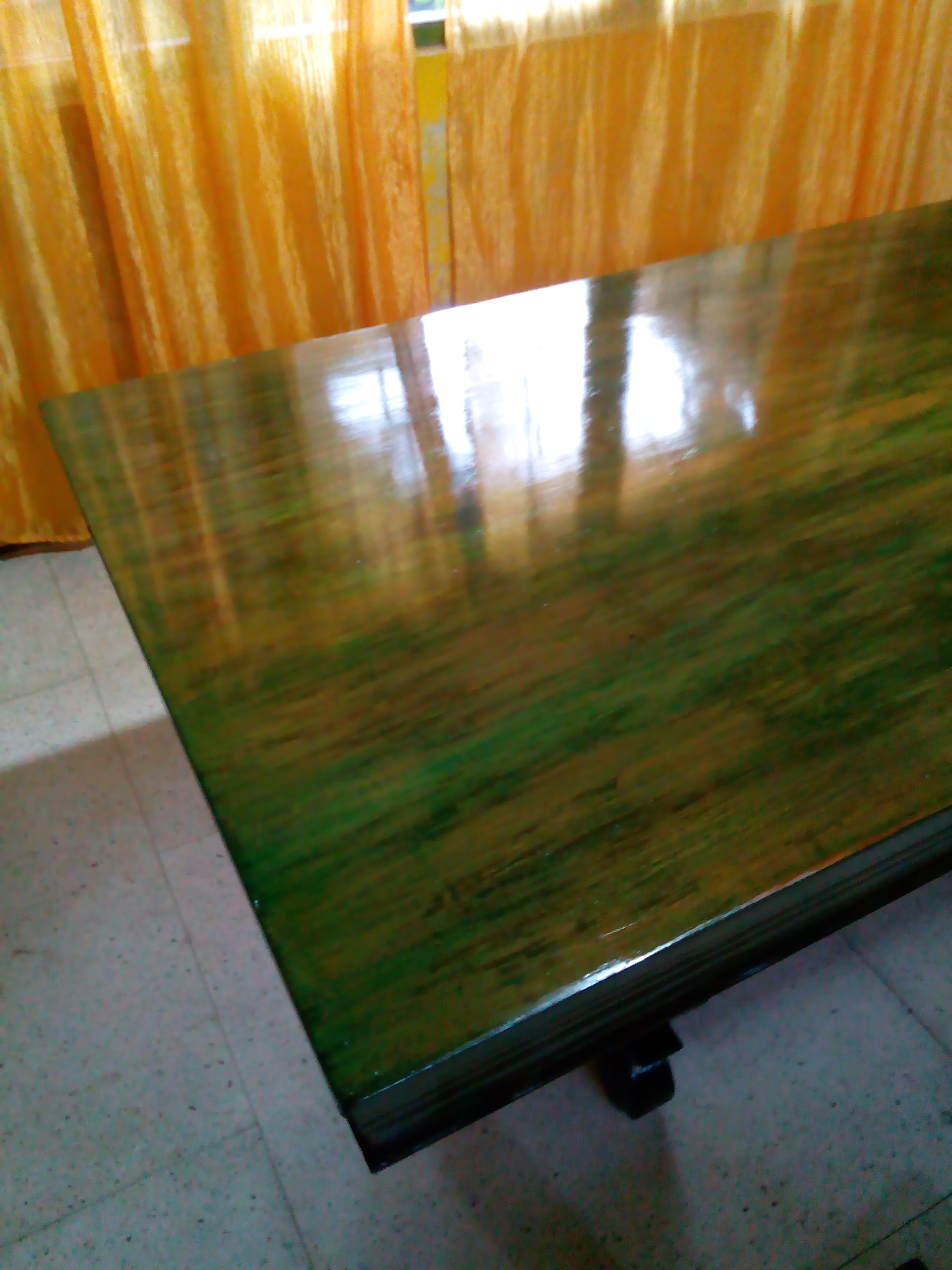
A table green wood-stained and varnished with three layers of polyurethane varnish

Polyurethane varnishes are typically hard, abrasion-resistant, and durable coatings. They are popular for hardwood floors but are considered by some wood finishers to be difficult or unsuitable for finishing furniture or other detailed pieces. Polyurethanes are comparable in hardness to certain alkyds but generally form a tougher film. Compared to simple oil or shellac varnishes, polyurethane varnish forms a harder, decidedly tougher and more waterproof film. However, a thick film of ordinary polyurethane may de-laminate if subjected to heat or shock, fracturing the film and leaving white patches. This tendency increases with long exposure to sunlight or when it is applied over soft woods like pine. This is also in part due to polyurethane's lesser penetration into the wood. Various priming techniques are employed to overcome this problem, including the use of certain oil varnishes, specified "dewaxed" shellac, clear penetrating epoxy sealer, or "oil-modified" polyurethane designed for the purpose. Polyurethane varnish may also lack the "hand-rubbed" lustre of drying oils such as linseed or tung oil; in contrast, however, it is capable of a much faster and higher film build, accomplishing in two coats what may require multiple applications of oil. Polyurethane may also be applied over a straight oil finish, but because of the relatively slow curing time of oils, the emission of certain chemical byproducts, and the need for exposure to oxygen from the air, care must be taken that the oils are sufficiently cured to accept the polyurethane. One of the disadvantages of a polyurethane-based varnish is the tendency to yellow over time. This is because the hydroxyl groups of a regular alkyd are reacted with TDI to produce a urethane-alkyd. This introduces a high degree of aromaticity and hence tendency to yellow.

Unlike drying oils and alkyds which cure after evaporation of the solvent and upon reaction with oxygen from the air, true polyurethane coatings cure after evaporation of the solvent and then either by a variety of reactions of chemicals within the original mix, or by reaction with moisture from the air. Certain polyurethane products are "hybrids" and combine different aspects of their parent components. "Oil-modified" polyurethanes, whether water-borne or solvent-borne, are currently the most widely used wood floor finishes.

Exterior use of polyurethane varnish may be problematic due to its heightened susceptibility to deterioration through ultra-violet light exposure. All clear or translucent varnishes, and indeed all film-polymer coatings (e.g. paint, stain, epoxy, synthetic plastic, etc.) are susceptible to this damage in varying degrees. Pigments in paints and stains protect against UV damage. UV-absorbers are added to polyurethane and other varnishes (e.g. spar varnish) to work against UV damage but are decreasingly effective over the course of 2–4 years, depending on the quantity and quality of UV-absorbers added, as well as the severity and duration of sun exposure. Water exposure, humidity, temperature extremes, and other environmental factors affect all finishes.

=== Lacquer ===
The word lacquer refers to quick-drying, solvent-based varnishes or paints. Although their names may be similarly derived, lacquer is not the same as shellac and is not dissolved in alcohol. Lacquer is dissolved in lacquer thinner, which is a highly flammable solvent typically containing butyl acetate and xylene or toluene. Lacquer is typically sprayed on, within a spray booth that evacuates overspray and minimizes the risk of combustion.

The rule of thumb is that a clear wood finish formulated to be sprayed is a lacquer, but if it is formulated to be brushed on then it is a varnish. Thus, by far most pieces of wooden furniture are lacquered.

Lacquer may be considered different from varnish because it can be re-dissolved later by a solvent (such as the one it was dissolved in when it was applied) and does not chemically change to a solid like other varnishes.

=== Acrylic ===
Acrylic resin varnishes are typically water-borne varnishes with the lowest refractive index of all finishes and high transparency. They resist yellowing. Acrylics have the advantage of water clean-up and lack of solvent fumes, but typically do not penetrate into wood as well as oils. They sometimes lack the brushability and self-leveling qualities of solvent-based varnishes. Generally they have good UV-resistance.

In the art world, varnishes offer dust-resistance and a harder surface than bare paint – they sometimes have the benefit of ultraviolet light resistors, which help protect artwork from fading in exposure to light. Acrylic varnish should be applied using an isolation coat (a permanent, protective barrier between the painting and the varnish, preferably a soft, glossy gel medium) to make varnish removal and overall conservation easier. Acrylic varnishes used for such a final removable art protection layer are typically mineral-spirit–based acrylic, rather than water-based.

=== Two-part epoxy ===
Various epoxy resin systems have been formulated as varnishes or floor finishes whereby two components are mixed directly before application. Sometimes, the two parts are of equal volume and referred to as 1:1 but not always, as 2:1, 3:1, 4:1 and even 5:1 mixing ratios are commercially available. The individual components are usually referred to as Part A and Part B. All two-part epoxies have a pot-life or working time during which the mixed material can be used. Usually the pot-life is a matter of a few hours or less, but this is highly temperature dependent. Both water-borne and solvent-based epoxies are used. Epoxies do have a tendency to yellow over a fairly short period of time.

=== Conversion ===
Used when a fast-curing, tough, hard finish is desired, such as for kitchen cabinets and office furniture. Comes in two parts: a resin and an acid catalyst. The first is a blend of an amino resin and an alkyd. The acid catalyst is added right before application in a set ratio determined by the manufacturer. Most produce minimal yellowing. There are, however, two downsides to this finish. The first is that as the finish cures, it gives off formaldehyde, which is toxic and carcinogenic. The second is that the finish can crack or craze if too many coats are applied.

== See also ==
- Alkyd
- The Artist's Handbook of Materials and Techniques
- Brightwork
- Desert varnish
- Tack cloth
- UV coating – print finishing
