= Toepfer International =

German commodity trading firm

Alfred C. Toepfer International G.m.b.H.
- Company type: Gesellschaft mit beschränkter Haftung (GmbH)
- Industry: Commodity trading
- Founded: 1919
- Founder: Alfred Toepfer
- Defunct: 2014
- Headquarters: Hamburg, Germany
- Area served: Worldwide
- Products: Grain, agricultural commodities, feedstuffs
- Owner: Archer Daniels Midland (80%), InVivo (20%) (prior to 2014)
- Parent: Archer Daniels Midland

Toepfer International (Alfred C. Toepfer International G.m.b.H.) was a German-based commodity trading firm.

Founded by Alfred Toepfer in 1919, it was based in Hamburg, Germany. The company did most of the grain trading for the global food and agribusiness corporation Archer Daniels Midland, which owned 80% of its stock. The other 20% of the stock was held by the French company InVivo.

In 2014, ADM International completed the takeover of Toepfer International. The Toepfer office in Hamburg was renamed ADM Germany GmbH and dealt with the marketing and distribution of feedstuffs in Germany.
