= Danish oil =

Wood finishing oil

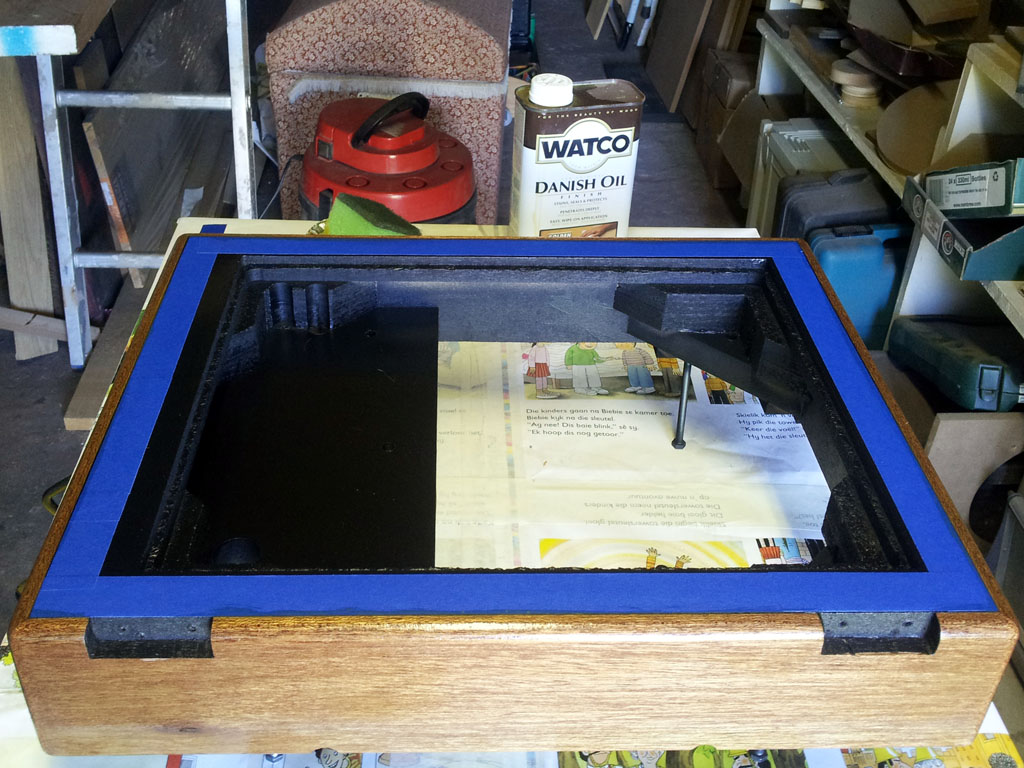
Danish oil being applied to a wooden plinth

Danish oil is a wood finishing oil, often made of tung oil or polymerized linseed oil. Because there is no defined formulation, its composition varies among manufacturers.

Danish oil is a hard drying oil, meaning it can polymerize into a solid form when it reacts with oxygen in the atmosphere. It can provide a hard-wearing, often water-resistant satin finish, or serve as a primer on bare wood before applying paint or varnish. It is a "long oil" finish, a mixture of oil and varnish, typically around one-third varnish and the rest oil.

== Uses ==
When applied in coats over wood, Danish oil cures to a hard satin finish that resists liquid well. As the finished coating is not glossy or slippery, it is a suitable finish for items such as food utensils or tool handles, giving some additional water resistance and also leaves a dark finish to the wood. Special dyed grades are available if wood staining is also needed.

== Application ==
Compared to varnish it is simple to apply, usually a course of three coats by brush or cloth with any excess being wiped off shortly after application. The finish is left to dry for around 4–24 hours between coats, depending on the mixture being used and the wood being treated. Danish oil provides a coverage of approximately 12.5 m^{2}/L (600 sq. ft./gallon).

== Spontaneous combustion ==
Rags used for Danish oil, like those used for linseed oil, have some potential risk of spontaneous combustion and starting fires from exothermic oxidation, so it is best to dry rags flat before disposing of them, or else soak them in water.

== See also ==
- Tung oil
