= Linseed oil =

Oil obtained from the dried, ripened seeds of the flax plant

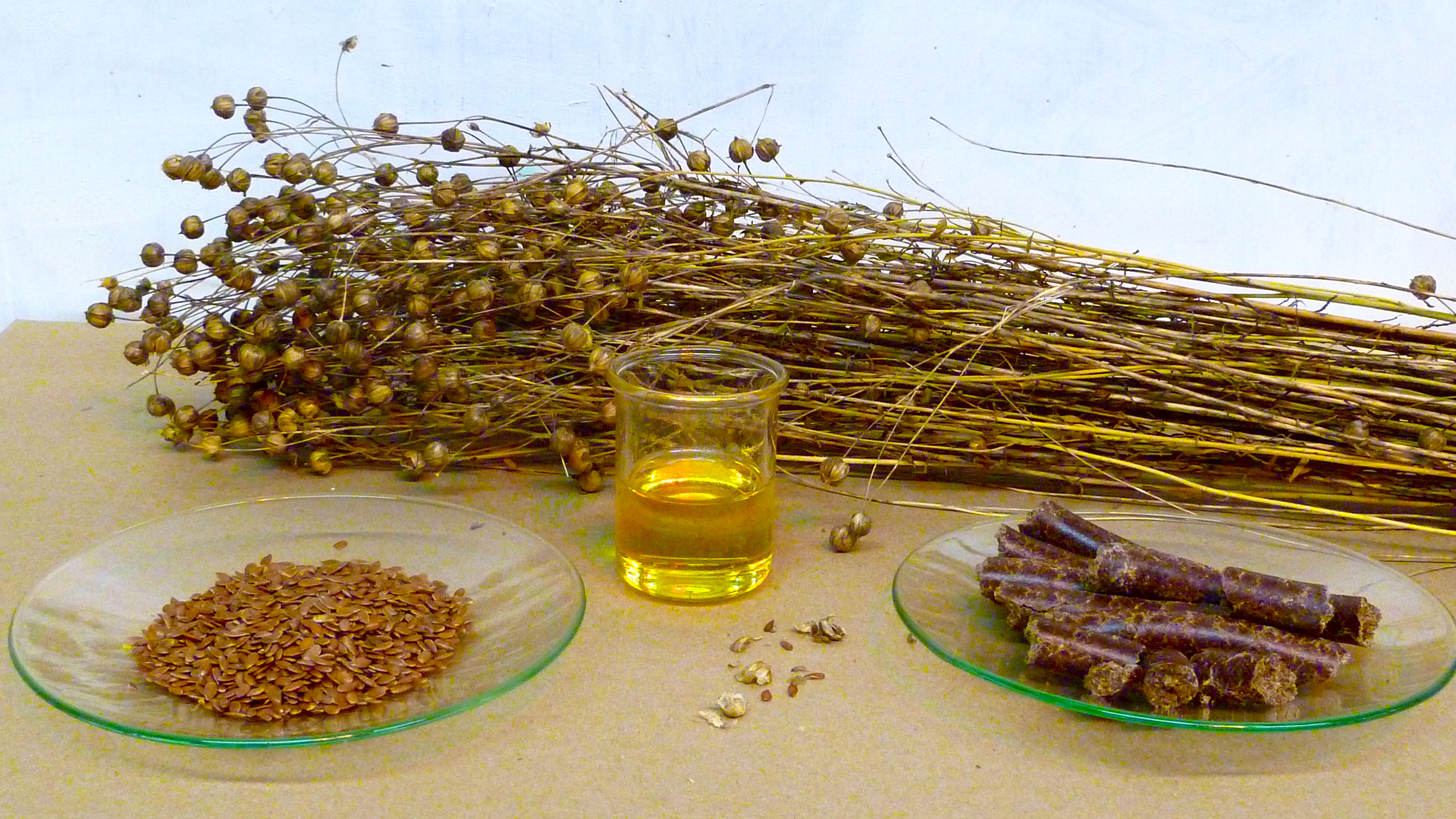
Flax, flax seeds, linseed oil, linseed cake

Linseed oil, also known as flaxseed oil or flax oil (in its edible form), is a colorless to yellowish oil obtained from the dried, ripened seeds of the flax plant (Linum usitatissimum). The oil is obtained by pressing, sometimes followed by solvent extraction.

Owing to its polymer-forming properties, linseed oil is often blended with combinations of other oils, resins, or solvents as an impregnator, drying oil finish, or varnish in wood finishing; as a pigment binder in oil paints; as a plasticizer and hardener in putty; and in the manufacture of linoleum. Linseed oil use has declined since the 1950s with increased availability of synthetic alkyd resins, which function similarly, are petroleum-based, and resist yellowing.

== Production ==
Linseed oil production

Per capita production of linseed oil

== Structure and composition ==
Representative triglyceride found in a linseed oil, a triester (triglyceride) derived of linoleic acid, alpha-linolenic acid, and oleic acid

Linseed oil is a triglyceride, like other fats. Linseed oil is distinctive for its unusually large amount of α-linolenic acid, which oxidises in air. The fatty acids in a typical linseed oil are of the following types:

- The triply unsaturated α-linolenic acid (51.9–55.2%),
- The saturated acids palmitic acid (about 7%) and stearic acid (3.4–4.6%),
- The monounsaturated oleic acid (18.5–22.6%),
- The doubly unsaturated linoleic acid (14.2–17%).

== Drying properties ==
Having a high content of di- and tri-unsaturated esters, linseed oil is susceptible to polymerization reactions upon exposure to oxygen in air. This polymerization, which is called autoxidation, results in the rigidification of the material. To prevent premature drying, linseed oil-based products (oil paints, putty) are stored in airtight containers.

Rags soaked with linseed oil pose a fire hazard because they provide a large surface area for rapid oxidation. The oxidation of linseed oil is exothermic, which may lead to spontaneous combustion. In 1991, One Meridian Plaza, in Philadelphia, was severely damaged in a fire, in which three firefighters perished, thought to be caused by rags soaked with linseed oil.

== Applications ==
Most applications of linseed oil exploit its drying properties, i.e., the initial material is liquid or at least pliable and the aged material is rigid but not brittle. The water-repelling (hydrophobic) nature of the resulting hydrocarbon-based material is advantageous.

=== Paint binder ===
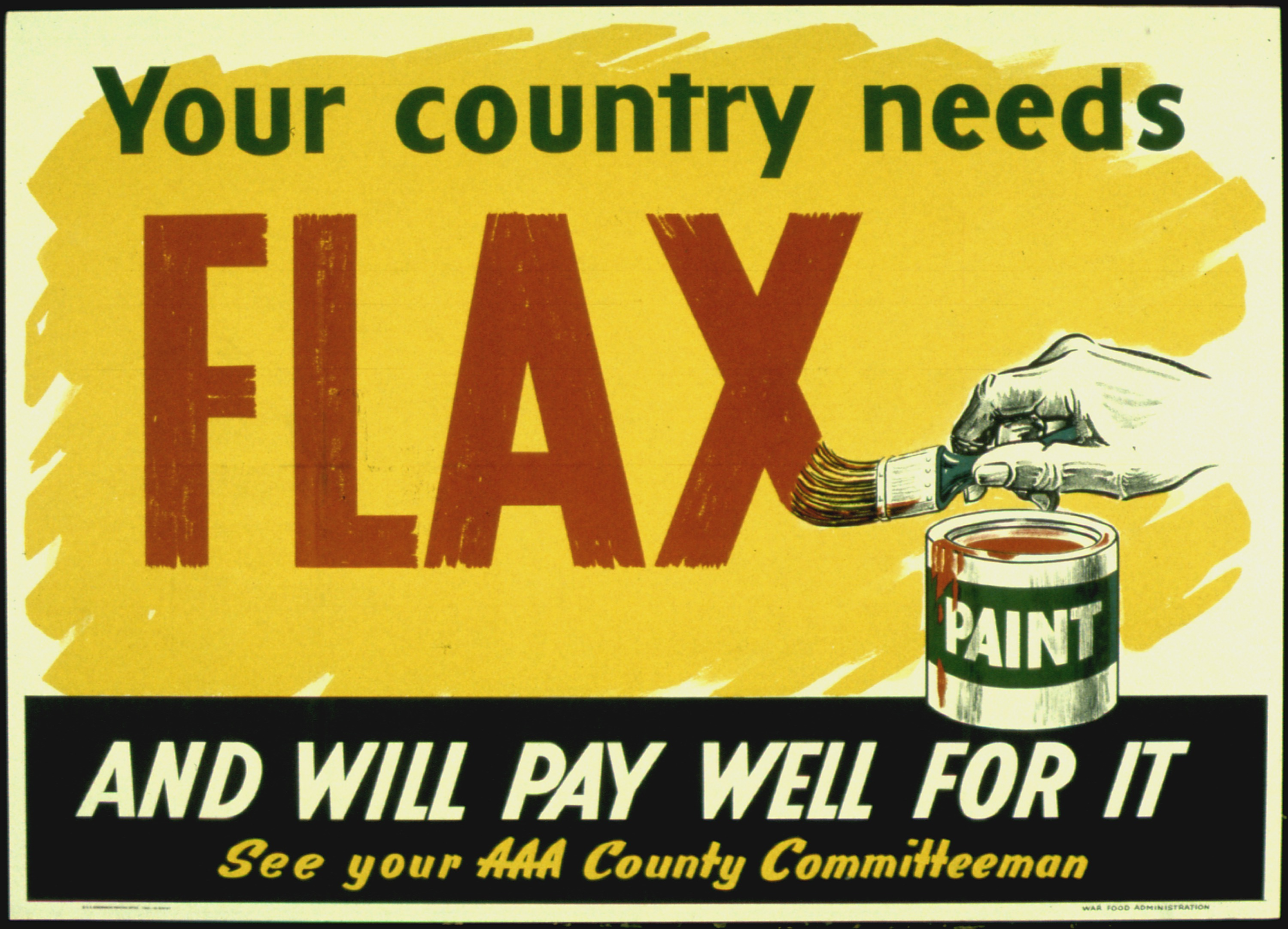
"Your country needs flax..." U.S. WWII poster soliciting linseed oil for use in paint

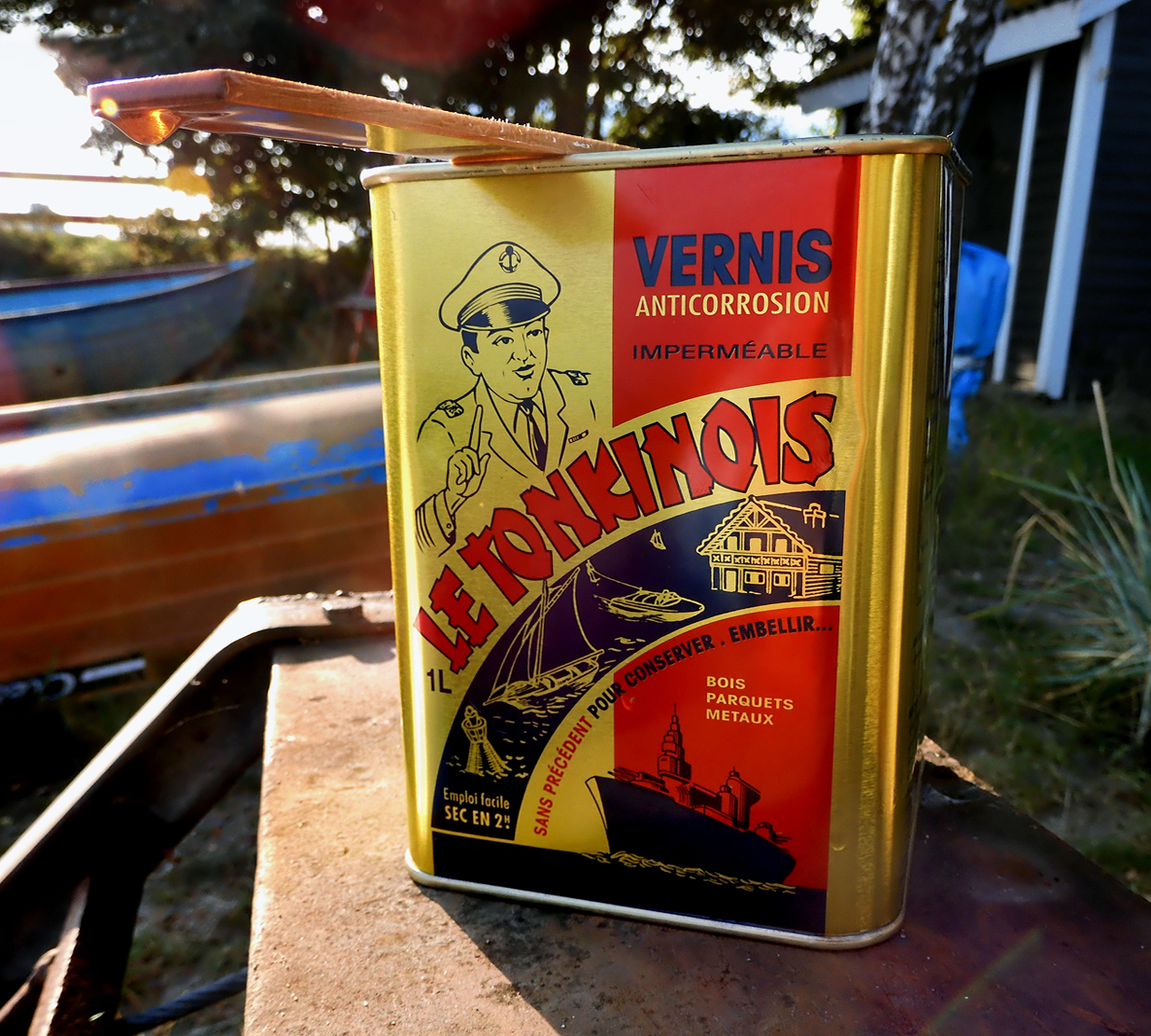
A can of French linseed oil

Linseed oil is the carrier used in oil paint. It can also be used as a painting medium, making oil paints more fluid, transparent and glossy. It is available in varieties such as cold-pressed, alkali-refined, sun-bleached, sun-thickened, and polymerised (stand oil). The introduction of linseed oil was a significant advance in the technology of oil painting.

=== Putty ===
Traditional glazing putty, consisting of a paste of chalk powder and linseed oil, is a sealant for glass windows that hardens within a few weeks of application and can then be painted over. The durability of putty is owed to the drying properties of linseed oil.

=== Wood finish ===
When used as a wood finish, linseed oil dries slowly and shrinks little upon hardening. A linseed oil finish is easily scratched and liquid water penetrates a linseed oil finish in mere minutes, and water vapour bypasses it almost completely. Garden furniture treated with linseed oil may develop mildew. Oiled wood may be yellowish and is likely to darken with age. Even though the oil feels dry to the touch, studies show linseed oil does not fully cure.

Linseed oil is a common finish for wooden items, though very fine finish may require months to obtain. Studies show the fatty-acid structure of linseed oil has problems cross-linking and oxidizing, frequently turning black.

=== Gilding ===
Boiled linseed oil is used as sizing in traditional oil gilding to adhere sheets of gold leaf to a substrate (parchment, canvas, Armenian bole, etc.). It has a much longer working time than water-based size and gives a firm smooth surface that is adhesive enough in the first 12–24 hours after application to cause the gold to attach firmly to the intended surface.

=== Linoleum ===
Linseed oil is used to bind wood dust, cork particles, and related materials in the manufacture of the floor covering linoleum. After its invention in 1860 by Frederick Walton, linoleum, or "lino" for short, was a common form of domestic and industrial floor covering from the 1870s until the 1970s, when it was largely replaced by PVC ("vinyl") floor coverings. However, since the 1990s, linoleum is returning to favor, being considered more environmentally sound than PVC. Linoleum has given its name to the printmaking technique linocut, in which a relief design is cut into the smooth surface and then inked and used to print an image. The results are similar to those obtained by woodcut printing.

=== Nutritional supplement and food ===
Raw cold-pressed linseed oil – commonly known as flax seed oil in nutritional contexts – is easily oxidized, and rapidly becomes rancid, with an unpleasant odour, unless refrigerated. Linseed oil is not generally recommended for use in cooking. In one study, the content of alpha-linolenic acid (ALA) in whole flaxseeds did not decrease after heating the seeds to temperatures of up to 178 °C (352.4 °F) for one and a half hours.

Linseed oil is an edible oil in demand as a dietary supplement, as a source of α-linolenic acid, an omega-3 fatty acid. In parts of Europe, it is traditionally eaten with potatoes and quark.

Food-grade flaxseed oil is cold-pressed, obtained without solvent extraction, in the absence of oxygen, and marketed as edible flaxseed oil. Fresh, refrigerated and unprocessed, linseed oil is used as a nutritional supplement and is a traditional European ethnic food, highly regarded for its nutty flavor. Regular flaxseed oil contains between 57% and 71% polyunsaturated fats (alpha-linolenic acid, linoleic acid). Plant breeders have developed flaxseed with both higher ALA (70%) and very low ALA content (< 3%). The USFDA granted "generally recognized as safe" (GRAS) status for high-alpha linolenic flaxseed oil.

==== Nutrient content ====
Nutrition information from IENICA and DGFETT
Typical fatty acid content	% (IENICA)	% (DGFETT)
Palmitic acid	6.0	4.0–6.0
Stearic acid	2.5	2.0–3.0
Arachidic acid	0.5	0–0.5
Palmitoleic acid	-	0–0.5
Oleic acid	19.0	10.0–22.0
Eicosenoic acid	-	0–0.6
Linoleic acid	24.1	12.0–18.0
Alpha-linolenic acid	47.4	56.0–71.0
Other	0.5	-

Nutrition information from the Flax Council of Canada
Per 1 tbsp (14 g)
Calories	126 k·cal
Omega-3	8 g
Omega-6	2 g
Omega-9	3 g
Total fat	14 g
Flax seed oil contains no significant amounts of protein, carbohydrates, or fibre.

=== Comparison to other vegetable oils ===
Properties of vegetable oils The nutritional values are expressed as percent (%) by mass of total fat.
Type	Processing treatment	Saturated fatty acids	Monounsaturated fatty acids		Polyunsaturated fatty acids				Smoke point
Type	Processing treatment	Saturated fatty acids	Total	Oleic acid (ω−9)	Total	α-Linolenic acid (ω−3)	Linoleic acid (ω−6)	ω−6:3 ratio	Smoke point
Avocado		11.6	70.6	67.9	13.5	1	12.5	12.5:1	250 °C (482 °F)
Brazil nut		17.6	26.7	26.1	55.7	0.1	55.6	457:1	208 °C (406 °F)
Canola		7.4	63.3	61.8	28.1	9.1	18.6	2:1	204 °C (400 °F)
Coconut		82.5	6.3	6	1.7	0.019	1.68	88:1	175 °C (347 °F)
Corn		12.9	27.6	27.3	54.7	1	58	58:1	232 °C (450 °F)
Cottonseed		25.9	17.8	19	51.9	1	54	54:1	216 °C (420 °F)
Cottonseed	hydrogenated	93.6	1.5		0.6	0.2	0.3	1.5:1	
Flaxseed/linseed		9.0	18.4	18	67.8	53	13	0.2:1	107 °C (225 °F)
Grape seed		9.6	16.1	15.8	69.9	0.10	69.6	very high	216 °C (421 °F)
Hemp seed		7.0	9.0	9.0	82.0	22.0	54.0	2.5:1	166 °C (330 °F)
High-oleic safflower oil		7.5	75.2	75.2	12.8	0	12.8	very high	212 °C (414 °F)
Olive (extra virgin)		13.8	73.0	71.3	10.5	0.7	9.8	14:1	193 °C (380 °F)
Palm		49.3	37.0	40	9.3	0.2	9.1	45.5:1	235 °C (455 °F)
Palm	hydrogenated	88.2	5.7		0				
Peanut		16.2	57.1	55.4	19.9	0.318	19.6	61.6:1	232 °C (450 °F)
Rice bran oil		25	38.4	38.4	36.6	2.2	34.4	15.6:1	232 °C (450 °F)
Sesame		14.2	39.7	39.3	41.7	0.3	41.3	138:1	
Soybean		15.6	22.8	22.6	57.7	7	51	7.3:1	238 °C (460 °F)
Soybean	partially hydrogenated	14.9	43.0	42.5	37.6	2.6	34.9	13.4:1	
Sunflower oil		8.99	63.4	62.9	20.7	0.16	20.5	128:1	227 °C (440 °F)
Walnut oil	unrefined	9.1	22.8	22.2	63.3	10.4	52.9	5:1	160 °C (320 °F)

=== Additional uses ===
- Animal care products
- Bicycle maintenance
  (as a thread fixative, rust inhibitor, and lubricant)
- Composition ornament for moulded decoration
- Earthen floors
- Animal feeds
- Industrial lubricant
- Leather treatment
- Oilcloth
- Particle detectors
- Textiles
- Wood preservative
  (including as an active ingredient of Danish oil)
- Cookware seasoning
- Plant protection

== Modified linseed oils ==
=== Stand oil ===
Stand oil is generated by heating linseed oil near 300 °C for a few days in the complete absence of air. Under these conditions, the polyunsaturated fatty esters convert to conjugated dienes, which then undergo Diels-Alder reactions, leading to crosslinking. The product, which is highly viscous, gives highly uniform coatings that "dry" to more elastic coatings than linseed oil itself. Soybean oil can be treated similarly, but converts more slowly. On the other hand, tung oil converts very quickly, being complete in minutes at 260 °C. Coatings prepared from stand oils are less prone to yellowing than are coatings derived from the parent oils.

=== Boiled linseed oil ===
Boiled linseed oil is a combination of raw linseed oil, stand oil (see above), and metallic oil drying agents (catalysts to accelerate drying). In the Medieval era, linseed oil was boiled with lead oxide (litharge) to give a product called boiled linseed oil: The lead oxide forms lead "soaps" (lead oxide is alkaline) that promote hardening (polymerisation) of linseed oil by reaction with atmospheric oxygen. Heating shortens its drying time.

=== Raw linseed oil ===
Raw linseed oil is the base oil, unprocessed and without driers or thinners. It is mostly used as a feedstock for making a boiled oil. It does not cure sufficiently well or quickly to be regarded as a drying oil. Raw linseed is sometimes used for oiling cricket bats to increase surface friction for better ball control. It was also used to treat leather flat belt drives to reduce slipping.

== See also ==
- Danish oil
- Flax seed
- Linoleum
- National Linseed Oil Trust
- Smoke point
