= Anti-trespass panels =

Railroad safety measure

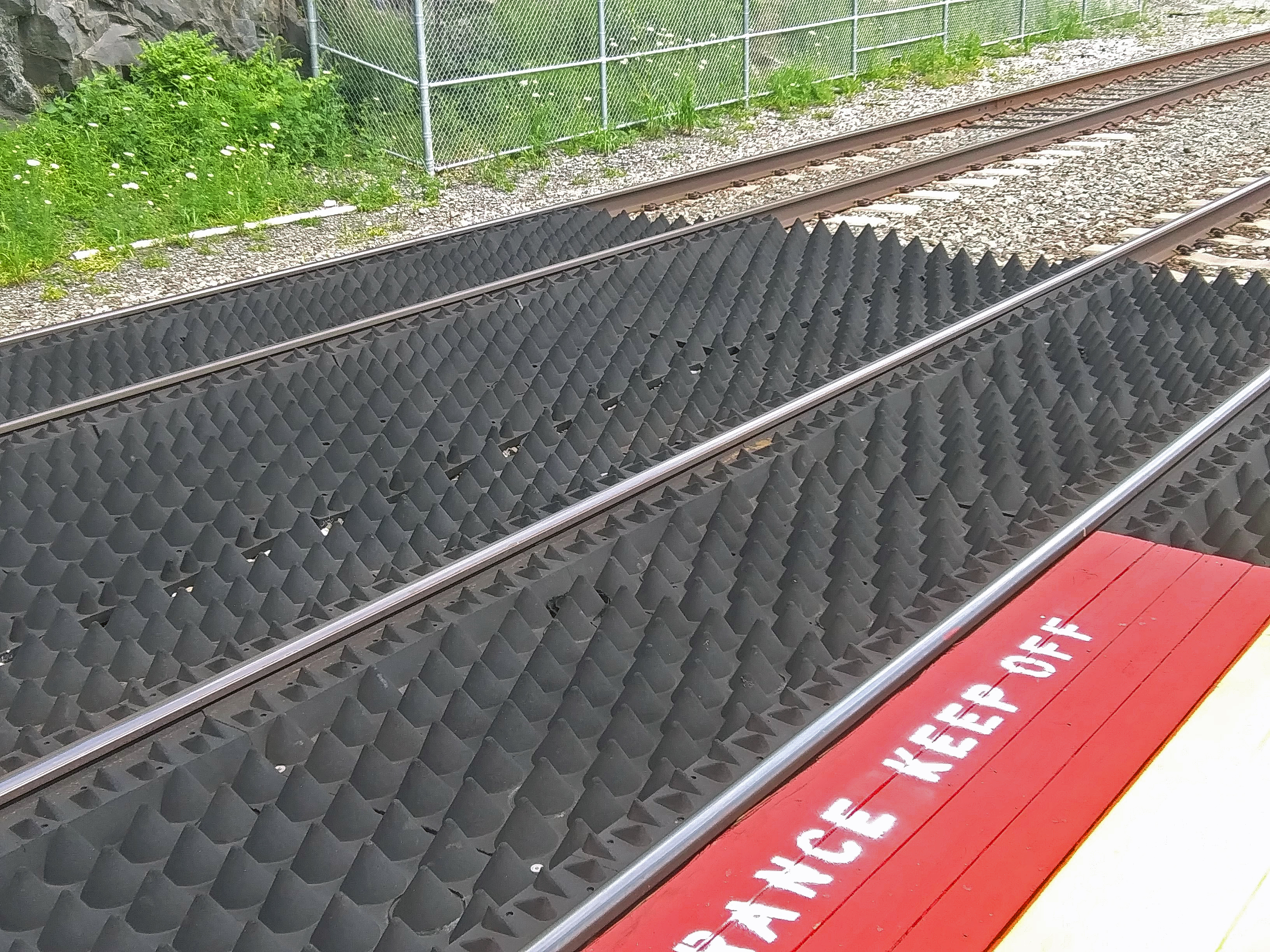
Rubber anti-trespass panels in and near tracks at Breakneck Ridge station, in U.S. state of New York

Anti-trespass panels (ATPs) are a type of hostile architecture used by railroads to improve safety by reducing pedestrian accidents. They consist of materials such as wood or rubber arranged in such a way that they are difficult to walk on stably, and are placed adjacent to pedestrian crossings or stations, where there is a possibility that people might trespass on the railroad's right-of-way and be struck and killed or seriously injured by passing trains.

The panels were first used in the United Kingdom. Many are still in place; they consist of wooden planks arrayed in a sawtooth pattern, on which it is difficult to stand or walk steadily. Modern variants, introduced in the early 2000s, used rubber shaped into pyramids, and later cones, a configuration that has led to the nickname witches' hats.

Since their introduction anti-trespass panels have been used elsewhere in Europe, Australia, Canada and the United States. Studies have confirmed their effectiveness in preventing accidents and suicide attempts. A U.S. Federal Railroad Administration study found that one use reduced incursions into the track area by 38 percent, and one in Belgium found a near-total elimination of trespasses.

== Description ==
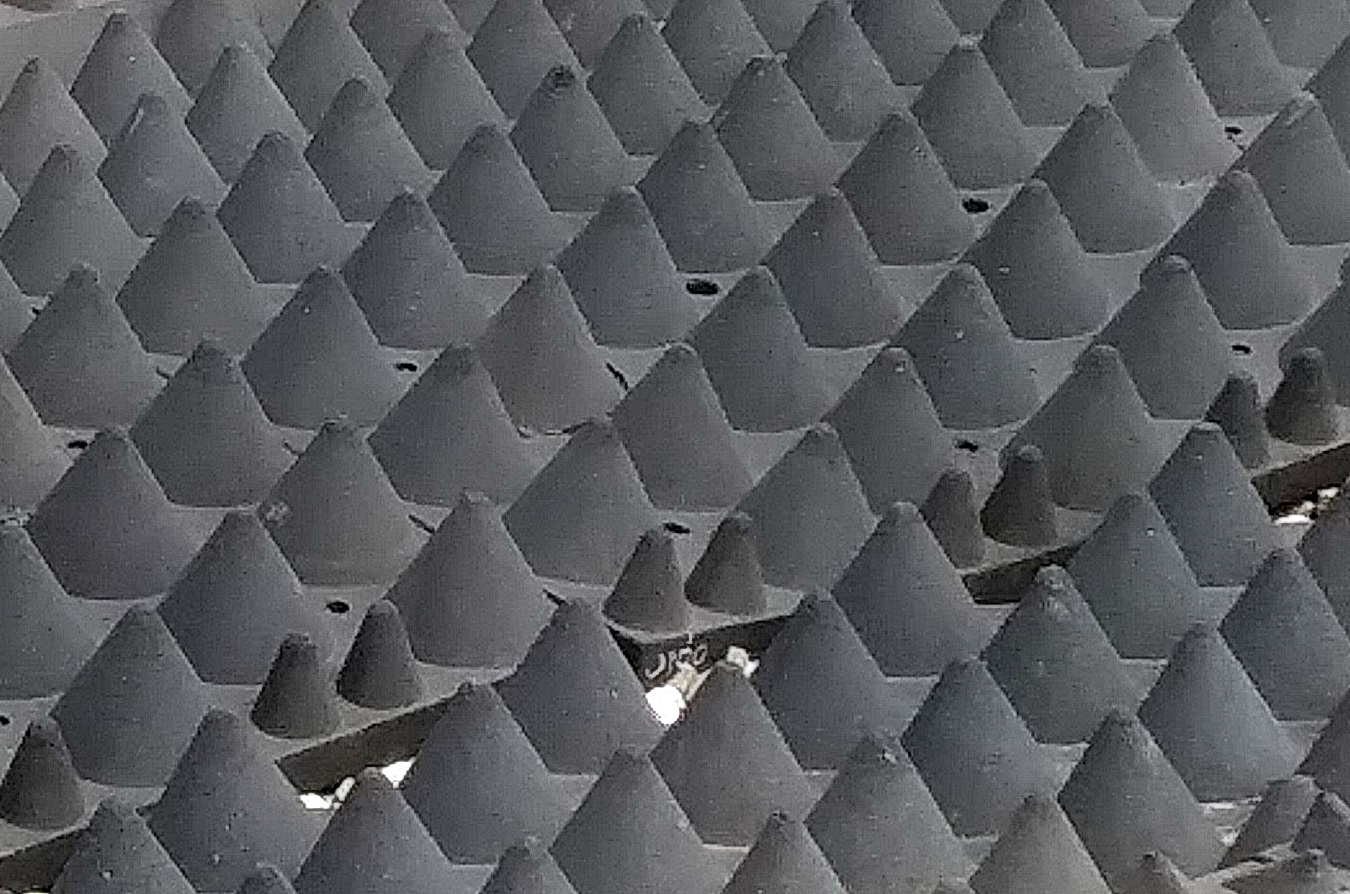
Closeup of conical anti-trespass panel

Older anti-trespass panels are not panels as such but rather sets of long wooden or fiberglass planks arranged in a skewed pattern, derived from cattle grids, that is difficult to walk on. The modern kind, introduced in the early 21st century, consists of rubber panels, 90–130 centimetres (35–51 in) long, with conical or pyramidal upward projections around 150 millimetres (5.9 in) high One manufacturer makes the pyramids on the panels it designs for use away from the tracks as high as 300 millimetres (12 in). Regardless of height, they are tightly spaced to discourage walking, again by making stable footing almost impossible. Commonly the projections are of equal height, but not always.

When fully installed, on a plastic substrate, the panels weigh 74–90 kilograms (163–198 lb) each. Small-scale versions have been made for use in model railroading.

== Background ==
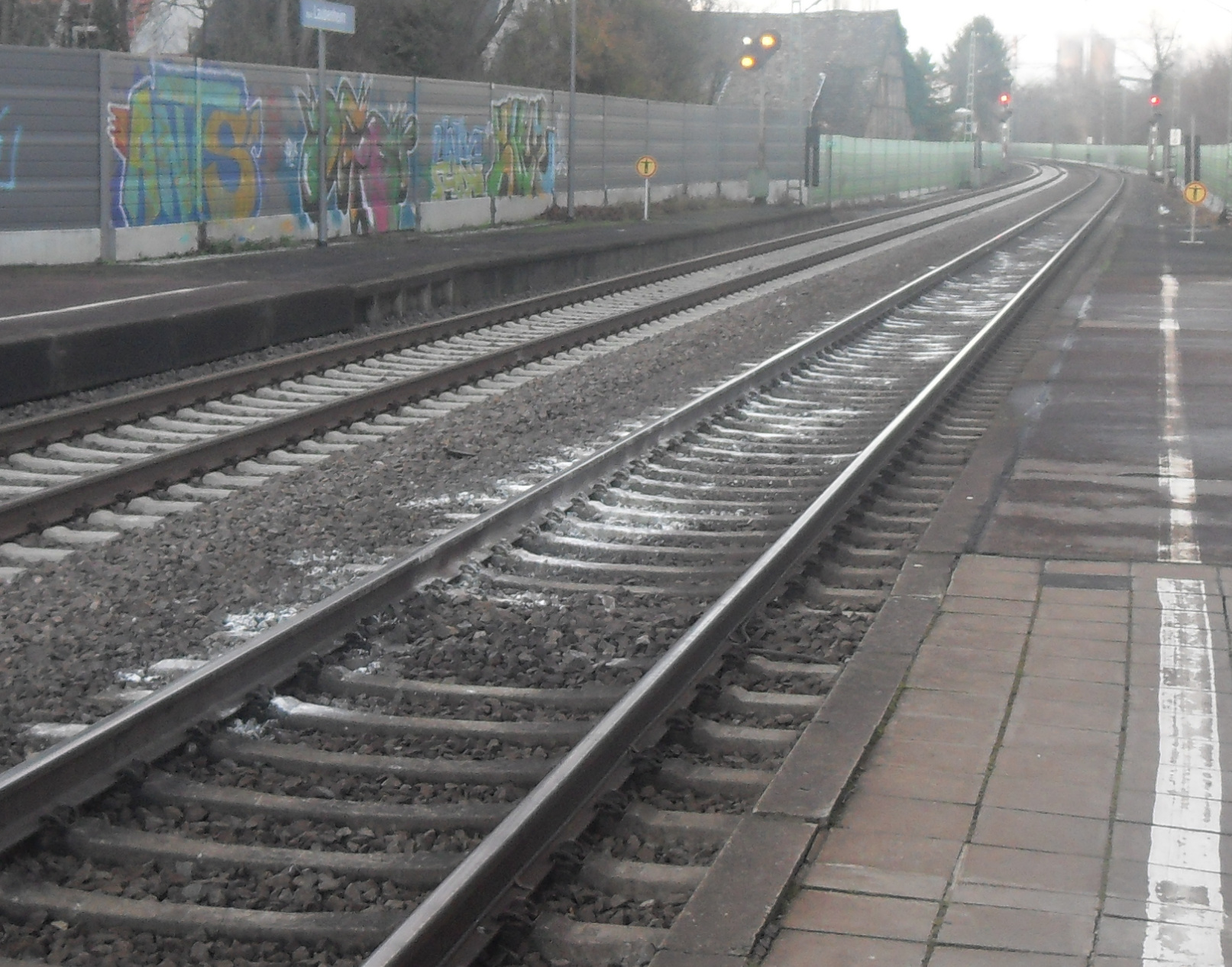
Lime placed on German railroad tracks after a suicide.

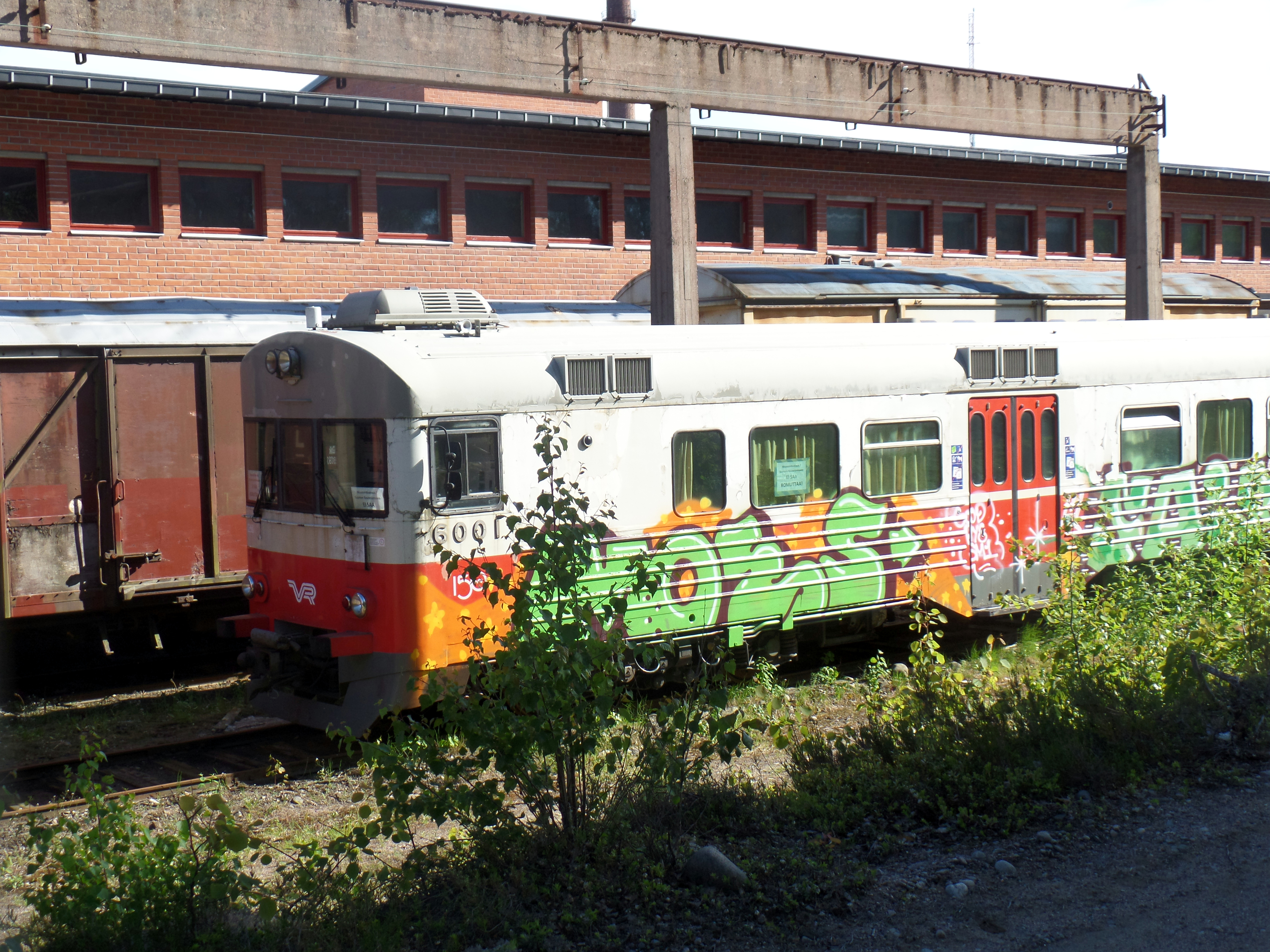
In order to deface a train with graffiti, vandals will often trespass on the tracks.

Pedestrians trespass on rail tracks and the adjacent land (which often lacks the clearance to avoid being struck) for a variety of reasons, including suicide attempts. In 2014, the European Railway Agency found that suicides accounted for 70 percent of all rail-related fatalities; other trespassers accounted for another 18 percent; in the U.S., engineers have reported, and cab cameras on trains have shown, that in almost a quarter of pedestrian-train collisions the former is lying or sitting on the tracks, suggesting an indifference or intent to be struck despite an absence of any other indicator of suicidal intent. On the whole, 61 percent of rail accidents involved individuals not permitted on the tracks. In the U.S. trespassing has been, since 1997, the leading cause of rail-related fatalities; three-quarters of which result from the trespasser being struck by a train (the rest involve slips or falls, collisions with a fixed object, or electric shock). (Note: The total number may be even higher as the U.S. Federal Railroad Administration did not until 2011 require railroads to report suicides; they had only to report those trespasser fatalities which local coroners or medical examiners did not find to be suicides. Also, in the past railroads were instructed that any deaths occurring more than 24 hours after the incident were to be considered injuries, not fatalities.)

Other common reasons for pedestrians to be on or too near to tracks include convenience of travel, either at crossings or along rights-of-way, socializing, thrill-seeking such as train surfing and recreational walking. (Note: Ian Savage, a Northwestern economist who studies rail safety, notes that railroad property may offer a better place for alcohol and drug consumption by men in their 20s and 30s (who make up the largest demographic share of U.S. trespassing deaths) than public parks, as it is less likely they will be seen or interrupted by others, local police have historically shown little interest in patrolling rail lines, and some measures meant to deter trespassing like heavy vegetation bordering tracks also serve to diminish the likelihood that those using the right-of-way for such purposes will be seen by those outside it.) Tracks have also become commonly used as settings for photography and video for social media, as well as feature films such as Midnight Rider, left unfinished after a camera assistant was killed by a freight train. They are also used by migrants seeking to cross international borders at points away from formal control. Homeless people also find shelter amid or close to tracks. Lastly are people with criminal intent, from fare evasion to vandalism, particularly graffiti, and metal theft.

The effects of a pedestrian-train collision go beyond the death or injury of the pedestrian. Engineers often suffer psychological trauma that requires at least 4.4 days off work; rescue workers, railway employees and any eyewitnesses may also experience similar effects. Train service is disrupted; delays average 120–140 minutes in the wake of a collision, with attendant financial costs (In Australia, it has been reported that one trespass incident can affect as many as 50,000 passengers; in the UK Network Rail automatically stops all trains in the area when trespassers are sighted). Passengers can be indirectly affected as well, with such incidents (including the graffiti left by trepassers who are not struck) negatively affecting their perception of the railroad's competence at the expense of further travel by rail.

While trespassing is a criminal offense in many jurisdictions, the threat of fines or even jail time does little to deter trespassers. In the US, freight carrier BNSF, the second largest railroad in the country, reported that in 2003 its police removed or arrested 23,200 trespassers, against 111 killed or injured. It is likely the former number underreports the true number of trespassers given the extent and remoteness of BNSF's 33,000-mile (53,000 km) network.

== History ==
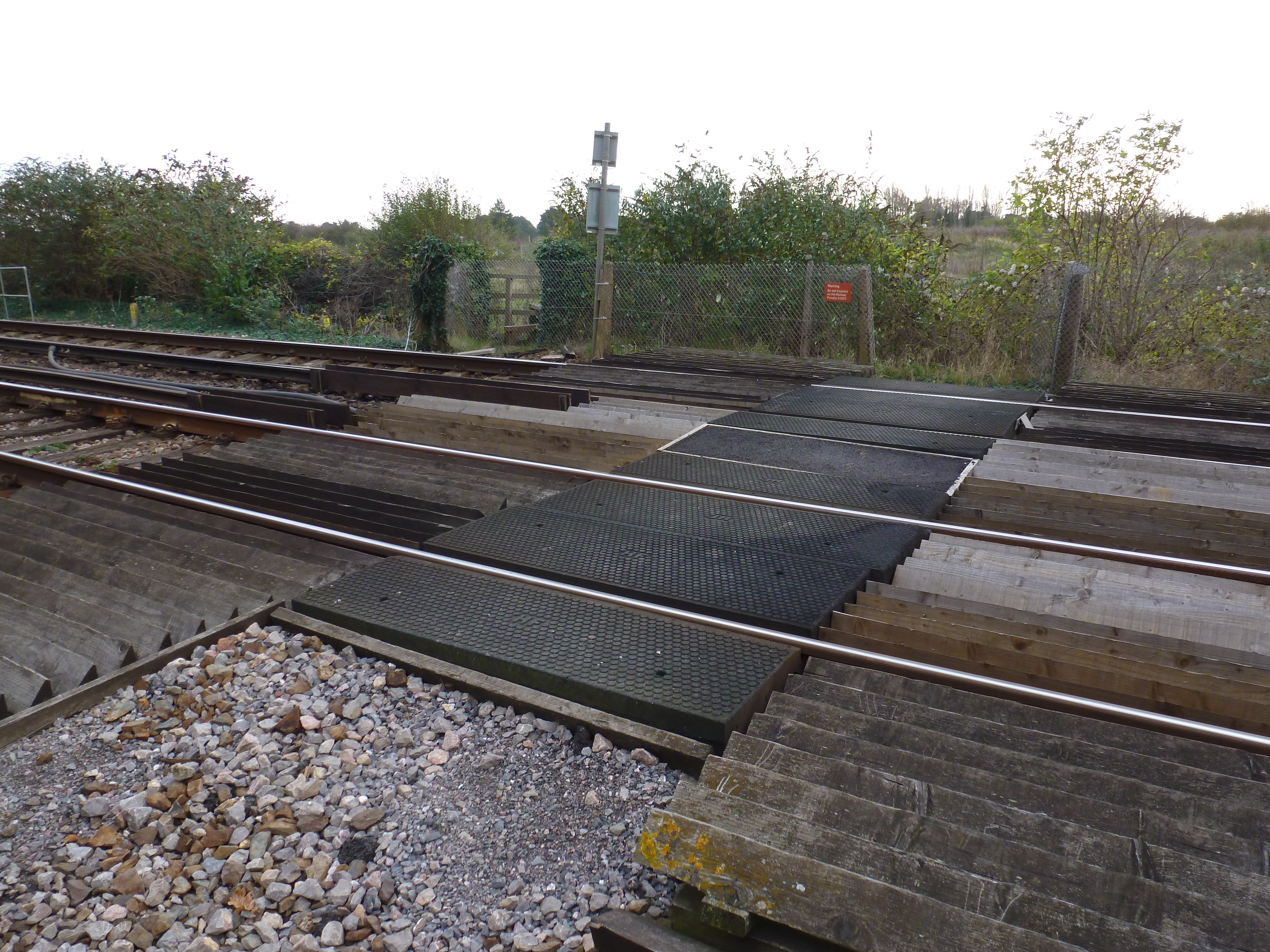
Wooden anti-trespass panels at an English foot crossing

In the UK, Network Rail had been piling angled wooden slats on the ground next to pedestrian track crossings, including vehicular grade crossings to deter trespassing as, so arranged, they present a difficult surface to stand and walk on. These were based on cattle grids, long used around the world to prevent grazing livestock from straying off their pasture, or onto tracks or roads where they might be injured or killed in collisions. Humans and vehicles can pass them while large animals with hooves become trapped. The design ultimately derives from stiles of stone slats placed to facilitate human passage over pits that developed on public footpaths in Britain, a practice that predates Roman times.

In the early 2000s a British manufacturer of rail crossing equipment, Rosehill Rail, worked with Network to develop the modern rubber anti-trespass panel. Made of rubber recycled from used automobile tires, they were designed to be light and install quickly, the ease of cutting allowing for them to be adjusted to the area in which the railway wanted to install them. In 2013 Rosehill introduced a refined version of the panels at that year's Railtex show in London based on feedback from railroads around the world that had used them.

Another innovation came seven years after that, in 2020. Originally Rosehill had configured the panels with pyramids. But that year, Canada's Metrolinx, which operates the GO Transit commuter rail service in the Greater Toronto area, had its panels made with conical obstacles instead after consultation with the manufacturer, as it believed those were harder to walk on. After installation at one location known for frequent pedestrian crossings along its Lakeshore lines proved effective in reducing those crossings, Metrolinx had the panels with cones installed at 17 other informal pedestrian crossings. By that September it was planning to extend the panels to two of its other corridors.

== Implementation ==
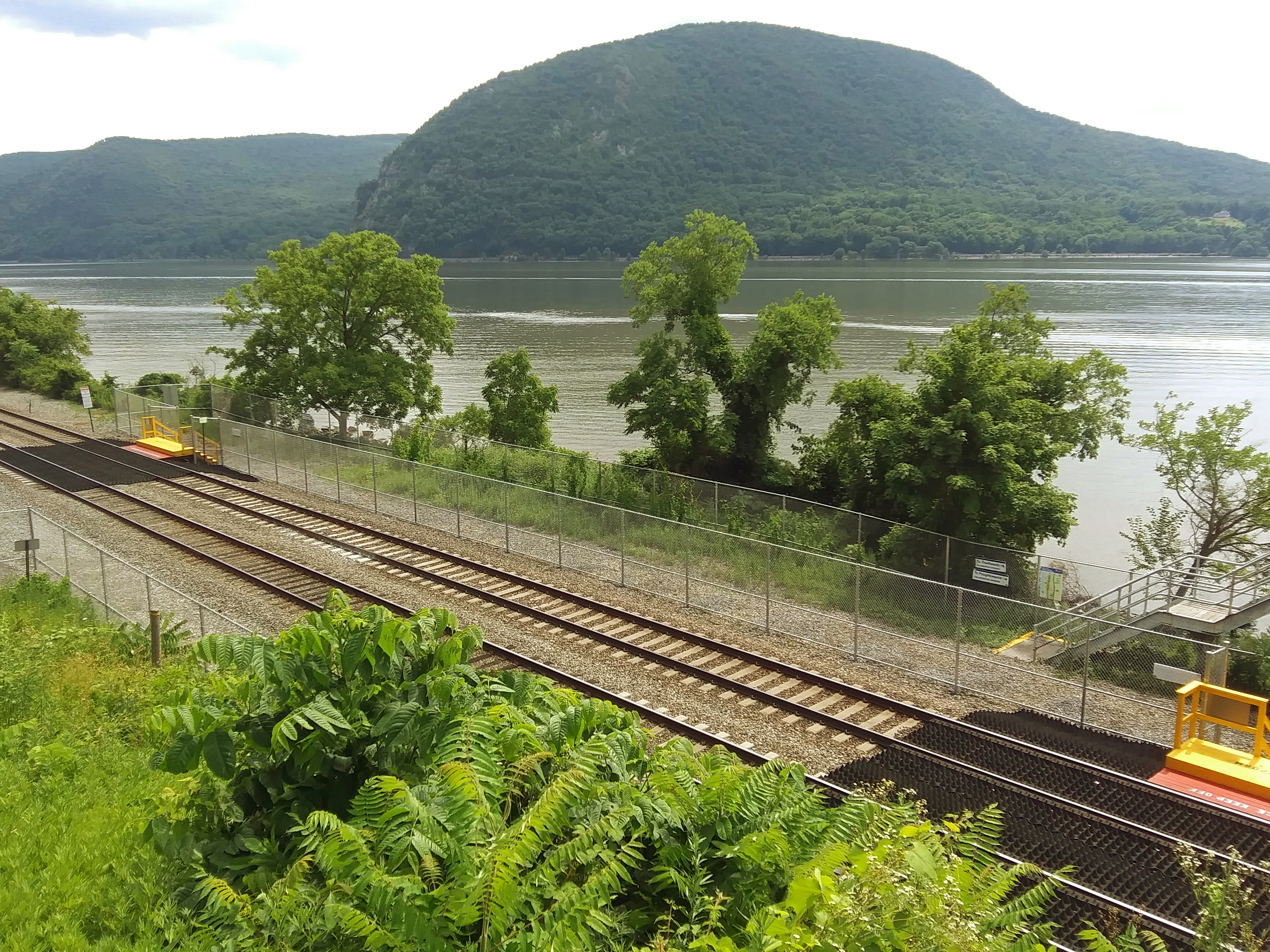
Wider view of Breakneck Ridge station, showing anti-trespass panels complemented by lengthy fencing alongside tracks

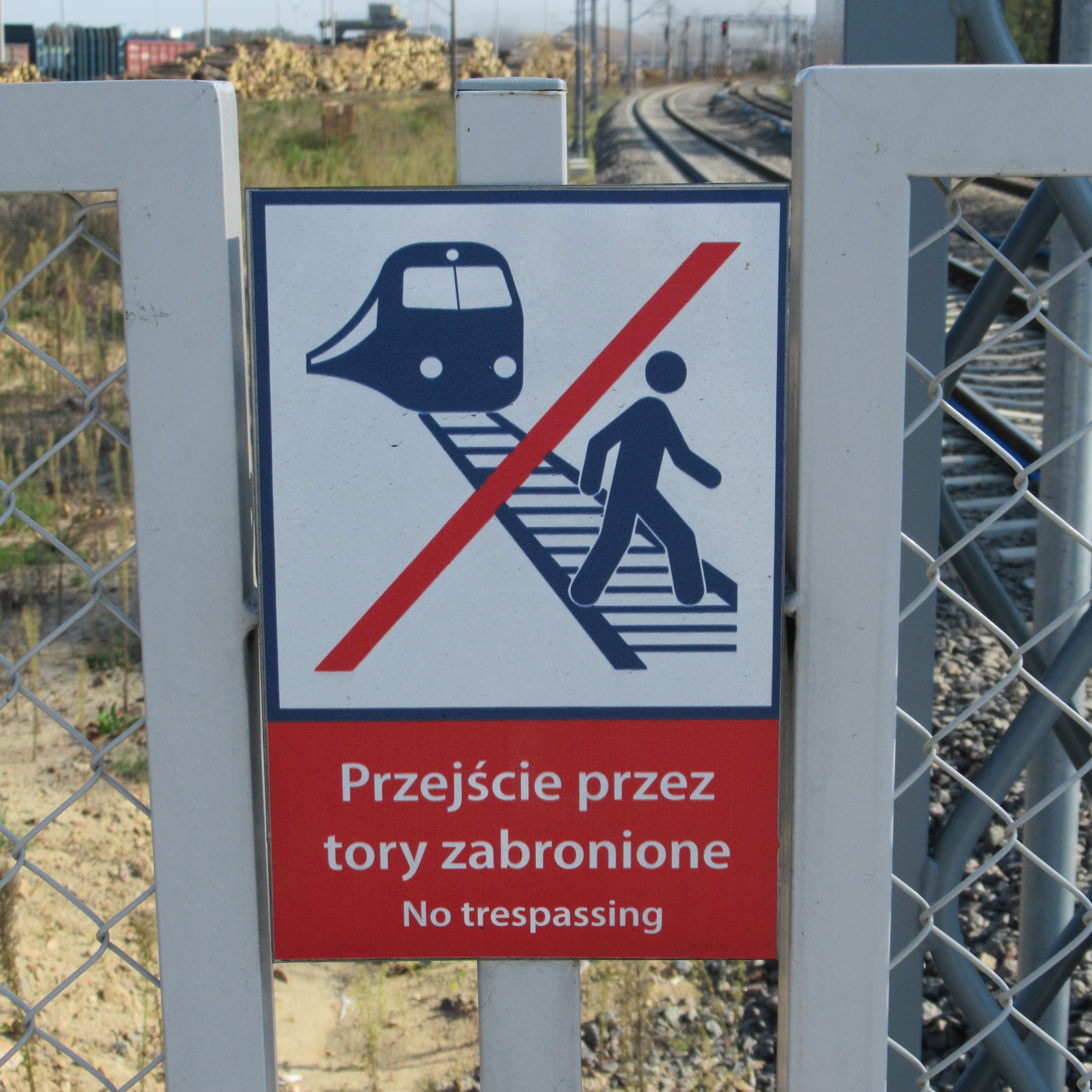
Polish anti-trespass sign

The panels come in a width equivalent to roughly four feet (120 cm), allowing their use within standard gauge tracks. Rosehill makes three varieties: double-flanged versions for in-track use, single-flange versions for installation aside tracks, and flangeless versions for areas not abutting tracks. They are held in place by long screws attached to plastic panels underneath.

In addition to areas adjacent to foot or road crossings at grade, panels have often been installed near the ends of station platforms, sometimes even on the ends of those platforms, since trespassers have been known to enter the right-of-way from those points. (Note: Based on its experience, the Swedish Transport Administration suggests not placing panels around switches, as not only do the rail and nearby switch box provide alternate surfaces to walk on, defeating the purpose of the panels, such avoidance might actually cause the accidents they were intended to prevent should a trespasser's foot get trapped in the switch if it is activated while they are on it. The agency also advises against placing panels where someone jumping off a platform might land on them as they might not be able to see them at night, and it should be possible for a trespasser who realizes the panels' purpose after stepping on them to get back off them.) It has been recommended that the panels be installed in strips at least 3 meters (9 ft) wide to deter potential trespassers from attempting to circumvent them by jumping. Best practices also include complementing anti-trespass panels with signage and fencing, preferably fencing that cannot be cut or easily climbed, (Note: In the U.S., fencing is not required unless there is a known risk of children trespassing on the tracks, as the tracks themselves are considered to be an obvious enough risk.) for distances as long as 500 m (1,600 ft) from the station or crossing.

Installation of CCTV near the access points protected by the panels is also recommended. The area near the crossing should be lit at night so that panels, possibly painted for high visibility as well, are visible around the clock. Anti-climb paint can also be placed on the panels to enhance their effectiveness and mark the clothing and footwear of any attempted trespassers, along with warnings to that effect on signage.

=== Advantages ===
Unlike rocks, the larger versions of the roughly cut stones used as track ballast, anti-trespass panels can be placed inside tracks without interfering with operations. Their appearance is also a visual deterrent as well as a physical one. The panels can be installed and removed quickly, and they can be recycled after use.

=== Disadvantages ===
The panels do not discriminate between legitimate and illegitimate crossers. It may be necessary to remove portions of the panels to provide access to the track area for regular maintenance of way work and replace them afterwards. Conversely, if a train must stop for emergency reasons and discharge passengers between stations, it may be difficult for them to reach safety without similar temporary removal of the panels or escape routes in any fencing adjacent to the tracks.

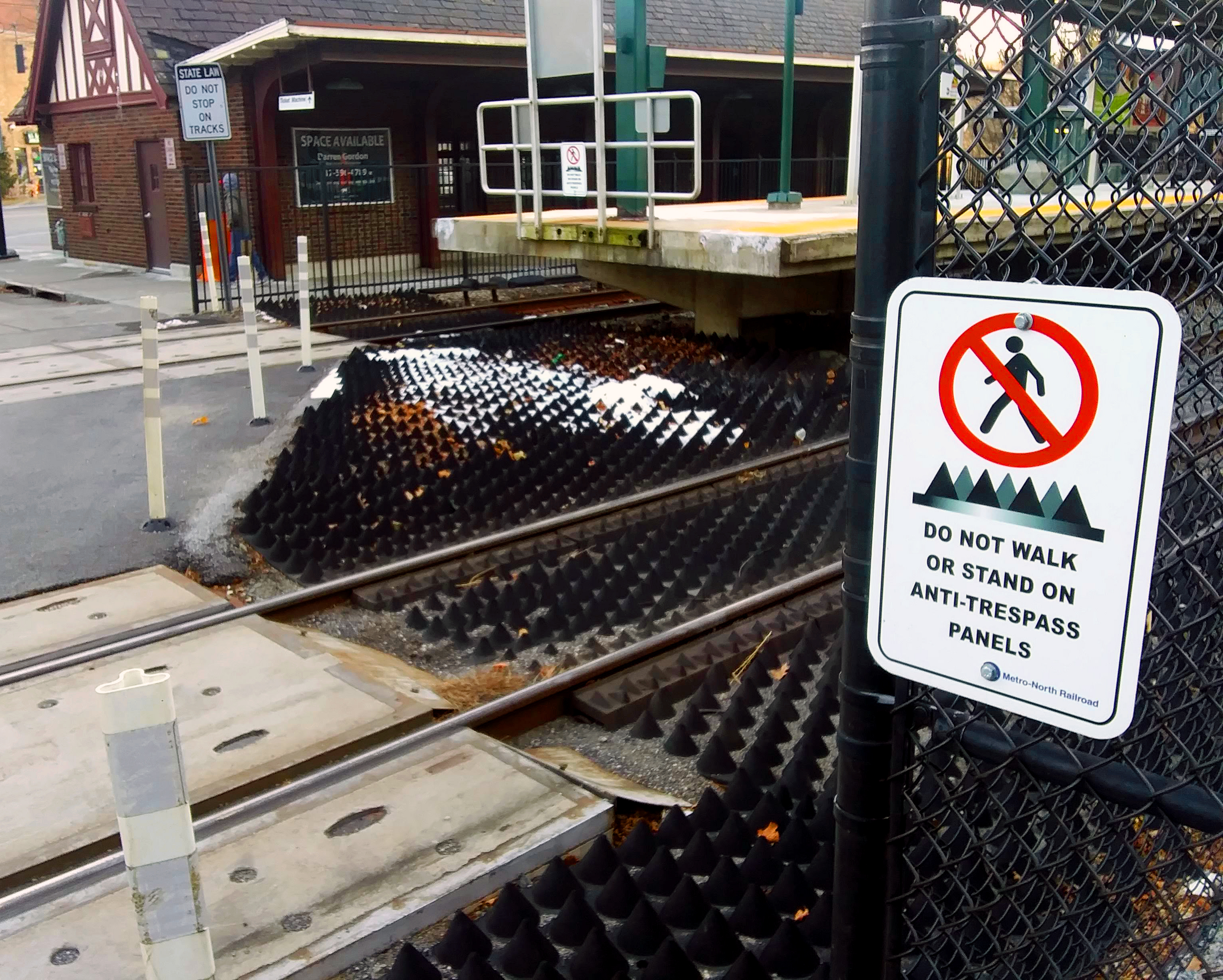
Anti-trespass panels with warning sign for pedestrians at grade crossing adjacent to Metro-North's Brewster station

Over time, soil and vegetative debris may accumulate in the spaces between the cones or pyramids, blunting their effectiveness at preventing trespass. Snow may also have the same effect in colder weather. The panels must be regularly monitored to make sure this does not occur. Also in wintertime, it is necessary to put up signs warning engineers to lift snowplows, or to add boards in the track forcing that to happen, prior to passing over sections of track with the panels inside in order that they not damage them.

It has also been noted that the panels may in one way cause the accidents they are intended to prevent. Despite their presence, some people may attempt to cross them to enter the track area anyway. They may then, particularly if they do so while under the influence of drugs or alcohol (the latter of which research has suggested is a factor in a majority of pedestrian fatalities), become trapped in the right-of-way and unable to free themselves from a train's path should one come along.

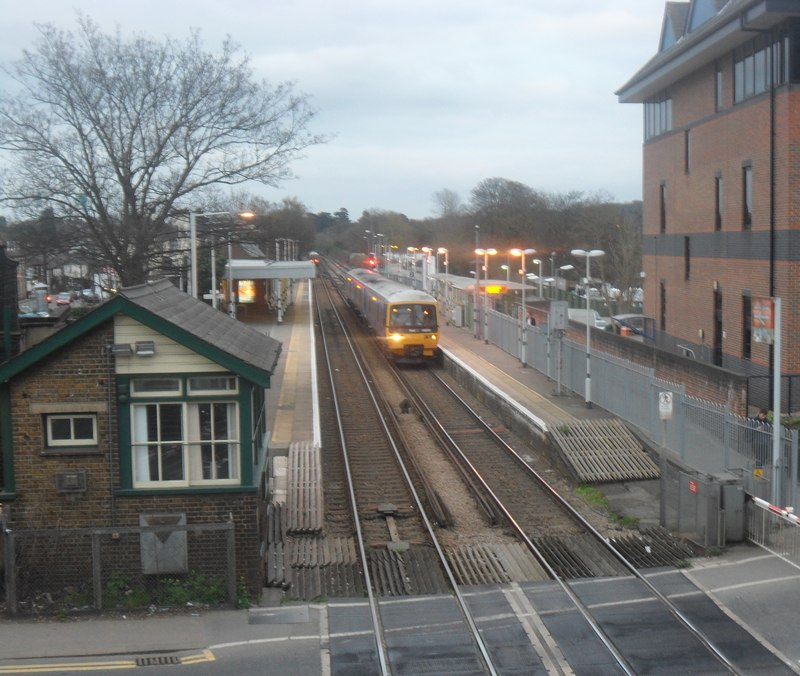
Anti-trespass panels used at Reigate station, used to access platforms from nearby grade crossing, photographed in 2012

In 2015, at Reigate station in Surrey, England, locals were observed using wooden anti-trespass panels to walk a very short distance onto station platforms adjacent to a grade crossing rather than walk several hundred feet (roughly 100 m) to the station's main entrance. Network Rail, station operator Southern and the British Transport Police worked together to raise awareness in the community and also installed CCTV to monitor the area. As of March 2023 a modern rubber panel had been installed on the ramp to one platform.

== Studies on effectiveness ==
ProRail, the Dutch national rail infrastructure operator, began using anti-trespass panels in 2014. It found a 30-90 percent reduction in trespass incidents depending on the implementation and the issues in the locations where they were used. Suicides seemed less affected overall, as they may have used more accessible grade crossings instead. (Note: ProRail later switched to using the wooden or fiberglass versions of the panels as these were lighter and thus easier to temporarily remove for maintenance purposes.)

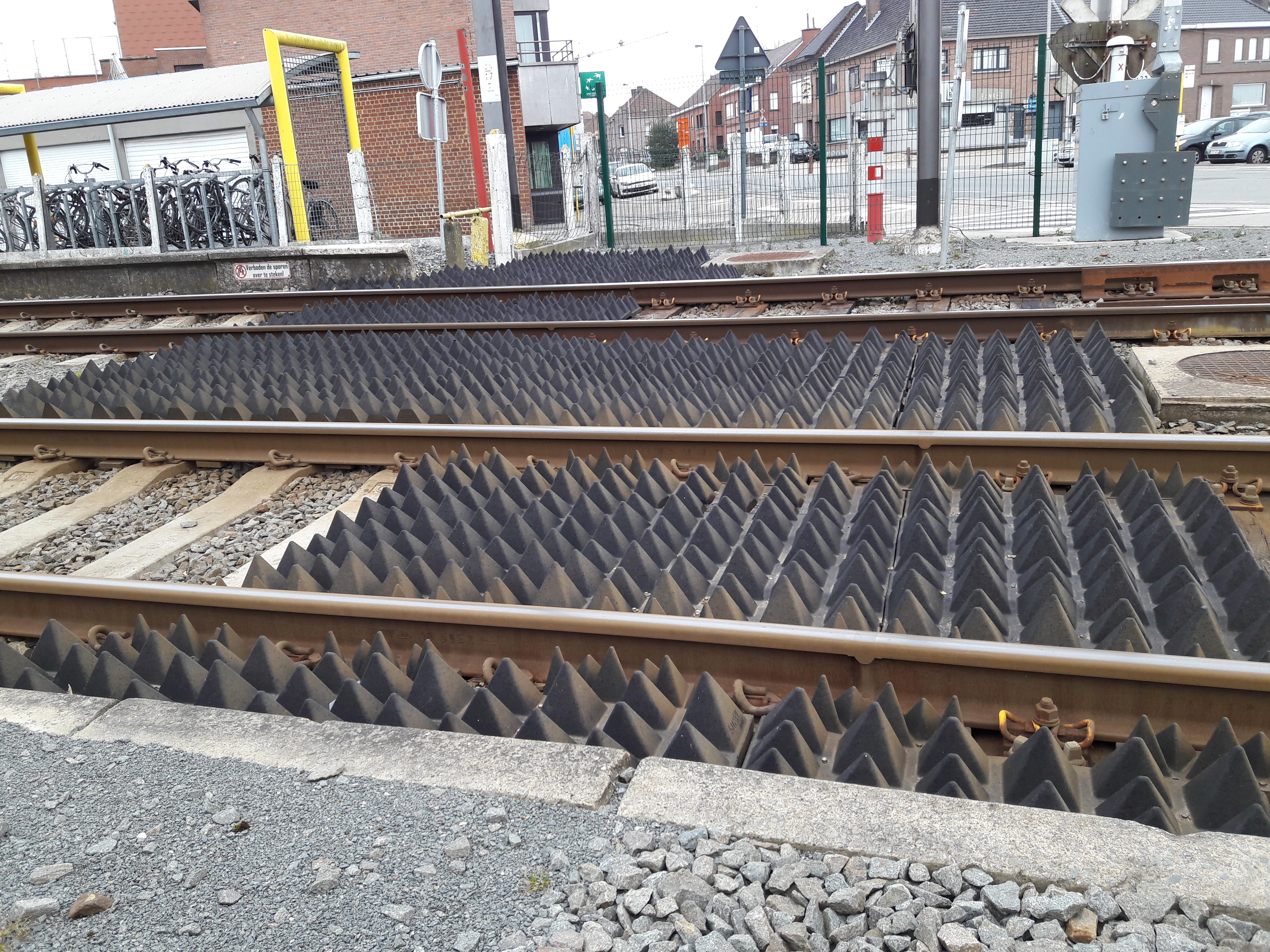
Anti-trespass panels, called Struikelmatten ("stumble mats") in Flemish, at the Viane-Moerbeke station in Belgium

In neighboring Belgium, Infrabel, ProRail's counterpart, also started a pilot program with the panels in 2014. It focused on a location known to have a high incidence of trespassing near three schools and a grade crossing. The panels were used in conjunction with fencing, CCTV, and warning signs. In the three months after installation, trespass decreased 78 percent from the same period prior to installation. After a year, trespass incidents had dropped even further, to 2 percent of the pre-installation level. Infrabel added anti-trespass panels to another 70 grade crossings around the country.

=== Sweden ===
The Swedish Transport Administration began a comprehensive study in late 2016, as trepassing fatalities increased yearly. It installed panels at six locations on the country's rail network (Note: Hudiksvall, Gävle, the Sävenäs yard in Gothenburg, Ramlösa Station in Helsingborg, Kalmar and Älvsjö. A seventh location, Malmö's Triangeln station, was planned but dropped over concerns about how the panels would affect any potential evacuation that might have to be undertaken in the tunnel they were intended to deter access to.) where there had been trespassing issues due to either nearby yards, a station close to a grade crossing, or, in one case, a short tunnel frequently used as a shortcut by residents. In all cases but one the sites were also monitored by CCTV to track trespass incidents, as were four other similar sites not equipped with ATPs.

Comparisons of trespassing at the test sites before and after the panels were installed showed that at all but one site it declined significantly compared to the period prior to installation and the reference sites, where in most cases they increased during the period after installation. At the one site where trespassings increased, that increase was small, only 4 percent, and less than the increase reported at the nearby reference sites. At one site, the commuter rail station at Älvsjö in suburban Stockholm, where eight trespasser deaths had been recorded between 2006 and 2015, no trespasses by members of the public were reported during the study period. At two sites, the presence of the panels had led to attempts to negate their presence, in one case by placing a wooden plank over them and in the other by cutting a hole in a nearby fence to allow pedestrians to bypass the panels. (Note: As of the early 2020s the panels remain at the south end of the platform in Älvsjö, Ramlösa, Hudiksvall, and Kalmar.)

Applying a cost-benefit analysis, the study concluded that implementing anti-trespass panels in the Swedish rail network would be profitable if delays are reduced by 12 minutes per site of implementation and year. (Note: That amount comes to US$50,000 and €41,000.)

=== United States ===
In the mid-2010s the U.S. Department of Transportation's John A. Volpe National Transportation Systems Center undertook a study at the FRA's request to see how effective anti-trespass panels were at deterring trespassers. (Note: At the time, in the U.S., the use of anti-trespass panels was extremely limited. The Chicago Transit Authority used the wooden variant at grade crossings near three street-level stations (Kedzie, Francisco and Rockwell) on the northwestern end of the Chicago "L" rapid transit system's Brown Line, where the presence of a third rail and its high-voltage current creates an extra incentive to deter trespass onto the right-of-way. By 2019 these appear to have been replaced with the rubber panels. Caltrans had also used rocks to discourage foot traffic from a nearby grade crossing to its Burlingame station. They have subsequently reconfigured that end of the station platform to include walkways on either side of the crossing to the platform.) It worked with the Arkansas and Missouri Railroad (A&M), a short line operating in those states, to identify areas where trespassing had been a problem for a test of the panels. The railroad and the agency settled on the south side of a grade crossing at West Dickson Street in Fayetteville, Arkansas. Video cameras in operation around the clock were installed at the crossing and the footage reviewed to count the amount of trespassers before and after the panels were installed; signs warning against trespassing were also installed. Along with the panels, gates were added to the crossing to supplement the flashing lights when trains were in the vicinity; the researchers did not believe this had any effect on trespass incidents since video footage did not show anyone on the tracks or right-of-way when trains came through.

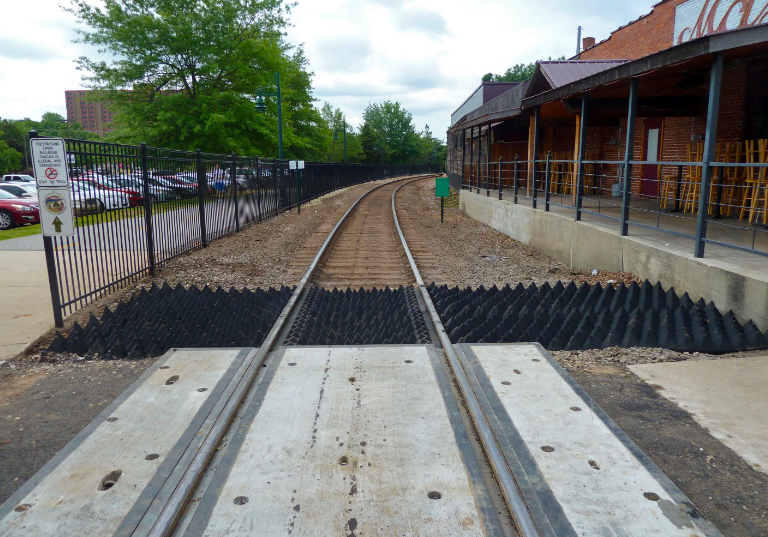
Panels at West Dickson Street crossing, with rail trail on left and bar on right

The West Dickson Street crossing is in an area of Fayetteville adjacent to the main University of Arkansas campus that is the city's primary entertainment district, with many shops, restaurants and bars. One of the latter has a patio abutting the tracks at the crossing, leading some patrons to use the right-of-way to climb over the patio's guardrails and enter the bar. It is also adjacent to the Frisco Trail, a rail-with-trail route that uses the right-of-way of the former parallel track. The regular foot traffic from campus is augmented on those fall weekends when the university's football team plays home games, bringing additional alumni and fans to Fayetteville, weekends that were included in the study period. Train traffic along the line, by contrast, is more limited, with approximately four freights coming through a day at speeds of 5–10 miles per hour (8.0–16.1 km/h).

After the 10-week study periods in fall of 2014 and 2015, both of which included the same number of home football game weekends, the FRA found that, overall, there was a 38 percent overall decrease in trespassers following the installation of the panels. The agency also found shifts in the pattern of trespassing, primarily in the time of day when it occurred. Trespassing went down during three periods of the day: the morning hours between 6 and 10 a.m. (when the least amount of trespassing occurred to begin with), the midday hours between 10 a.m. and 2 p.m., and the evening between 6 and 10 p.m. It increased post-installation in the afternoon between 2 and 6 p.m. and around midnight, between 10 p.m. and 2 a.m. The researchers theorized that the increase during those periods might be best accounted for by bar patrons cutting across the tracks to get to the bar's patio. Likewise, while an increase in trespass on Fridays and Saturdays was observed following the panels' installation, it was accompanied by a drop in Sunday trespassing.

The section of track and right-of-way was broken down into three zones from which trespassers could enter and exit the section. Approaches from the south of the crossing, where trespassers might already have been on the property for some distance, and exits at the crossing, dropped along with entrances and exits via the crossing. Trespasses from the crossing and the bar patio went up. A slight shift in the gender of trespassers was noted, but the ratio remained around three-quarters male.

== See also ==
- List of British innovations and discoveries
- Pedestrian railroad safety in the United States
- Platform screen doors, another method of preventing rail trespass, used at underground stations
- Anti-graffiti coating
- Anti-suicide blanket
- Anti-suicide smock
