= Anti-graffiti coating =

Surface covering for graffiti prevention

An anti-graffiti coating is a coating that prevents graffiti paint from bonding to surfaces.

Cleaning graffiti off buildings costs billions of dollars annually. Many cities have started anti-graffiti programs but vandalism is still a problem. Companies across the globe are attempting to develop coatings to prevent vandals from defacing public and private property. The coatings being developed can be the paint itself, or a clear coat added on top of existing paint or building facades. Depending on the substrate and the severity of graffiti, different coatings give different benefits and disadvantages.

== Types of paint ==
There are two common types of paint used today. The first are water-based paints such as latex and acrylic paint, and the second are oil-based paints. The paint of choice will depend on the substrate to be painted upon and the desired result. All paints have the same basic structure:

- Pigment – this is the part of the paint that is seen by the eye. The pigment gives the paint opacity and color. The pigments of all paints contain a white base composed of titanium dioxide (TiO_{2}) or zinc oxide (ZnO). Dyes are added to the pigment to attain the desired color.
- Binder – the binder is the glue that holds the paint together. This is usually a polymer that upon drying will polymerize to keep the pigments homogeneous and adhered to the substrate.
- Solvent – this is the bulk of the paint and is used to keep the paint workable when it is wet. After paint is applied to a surface, the solvent evaporates, and the pigment and binder will coalesce together to form a uniform coating. The solvent is water for water-based paints, and an oil for oil-based paints.

Paint drying on surface

There actually is no chemical bond between paint and an underlying surface. Paint adheres simply through physical forces like Van der Waals. When paint is first applied to a surface, it goes on as a thick wet coating. As the solvent is allowed to evaporate out, the pigment plates which are attracted to one another stack up to form layers. The binder polymerizes, essentially locking the pigment plates together. What remains is a uniform coating of binder and pigment. Anti-graffiti coatings make paints unable to adhere to the surface.

== Types of coatings ==
Anti-graffiti coatings can be invisible to the naked eye. There are two different categories of anti-graffiti coatings. The first, sacrificial coatings, are applied to a surface and then removed when graffiti is applied. The surface underneath will be left clean and a new sacrificial coating can be applied. The other type of coating are permanent coatings that prevent graffiti from adhering to a surface in the first place.

Newer coatings are made of charged polymeric materials that form a gel on the surface of the building or substrate. Some of the most important characteristics of anti-graffiti coatings are:

- Sufficient adherence without damage to substrates
- Hydrophobicity (water repellency)
- Environmentally friendly composition and processing
- Resistance to UV aging and weathering
- Good cleaning efficiency

=== Sacrificial coatings ===
A sacrificial coating forms a clear coat barrier over the wall or surface being protected. If the surface is vandalized, the coating can be removed (sacrificed) using a high-pressure washer taking the graffiti with it. The coating then must be reapplied. The materials used to make a sacrificial coating are usually inexpensive, optically clear polymers such as acrylates, biopolymers, and waxes. These polymers form weak bonds with the substrate to allow for easy removal.

=== Semi sacrificial coatings ===
A semi sacrificial coating known as a safety shield acts as a penetrating sealer on the wall or surface protecting the surface pores. If the surface is vandalized the coating can be partially removed using a combination of graffiti removal solvent and high-pressure washer. The anti graffiti safety shield is generally reapplied every second attack. While it is possible to use only pressure to remove coating, this will cause additional surface erosion.

=== Permanent coatings ===
Permanent coatings are often more expensive than sacrificial coatings, but if applied appropriately, they only have to be used once. These work by creating a protective surface that spray paint cannot bond to. After the surface has been vandalized, often all that is needed to remove the paint is a simple solvent like toluene and some manual labor. The underlying surface and the protective coating will remain undamaged.

Some of the types of permanent coatings include those based on polyurethanes, nano-particles, fluorinated hydrocarbons, or siloxanes. Polyurethane coatings are useful because of their barrier properties. High chain stiffness and high crosslinking density reduces the ability of the polymer to swell and absorb graffiti paint. Fluorinated coatings are some of the most effective in the field of graffiti prevention. Fluorine is the most electronegative element, meaning that it shows very little affinity for the electrons of other elements. When fluorine is attached to a surface, it will decrease surface energy at the interface, minimizing the contact with the graffiti paint. For the same reason that a Teflon-coated pan repels both water and oil, a fluorinated coating will repel water and oil-based paints. These coatings also have the added benefit of being chemically inert as well as very durable. They are also expensive and can be difficult to apply.

Silicon based coatings are hydrophobic, which means the surface repels water. This reduces the effects of photo-oxidation of surfaces.

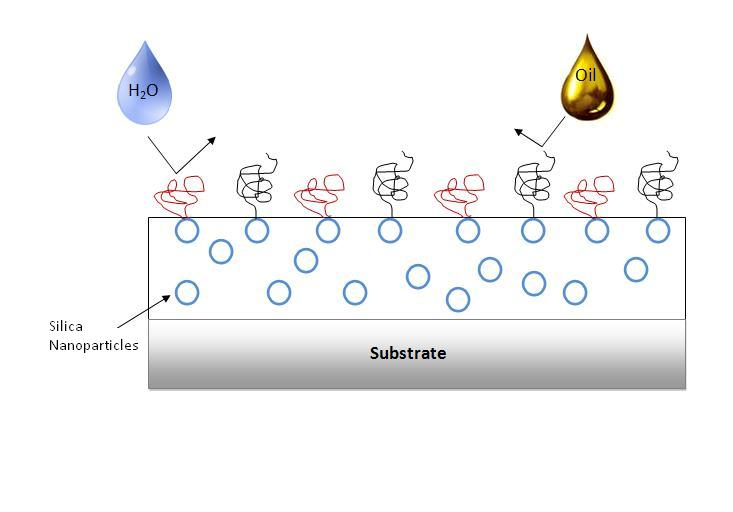
Hydrophobic and lipophobic ligands grafted to nanoparticles in coating

One of the newer additions to this ever growing market are nanoparticle based coatings. Silica particles are formed using the sol-gel method. The resulting silica particles have both reactive (Si-OH) and nonreactive (Si=O) groups on the surface. The reactive groups provide locations for further chemical processing, which allow you to change the surface properties of the nanoparticles. For anti-graffiti coatings, hydrophobic and oleophobic (oil-fearing) ligands are grafted onto the silica nanoparticles. Hydrophobic ligands are non-polar molecules such as hydrocarbon chains. Oleophobic ligands consist of polar molecules. Normally these two different types of molecules would phase separate in solution, for the same reason that water and oil do not mix. By chemically grafting the ligands onto the silica particles, this effect is counteracted. The effect is a coating that shows an equal dislike for both water-based and oil-based paints.

== Use on historic buildings and monuments ==
The use of anti-graffiti barrier coatings to protect graffiti-prone historic buildings, monuments, and other culturally sensitive surfaces may seem to be an easy solution to a persistent problem. Research suggests that the application of such coatings can cause physical or aesthetic changes or otherwise damage historic substrates. Both the National Park Service and English Heritage advise against the use of anti-graffiti coatings and promote the exercise of caution when they are applied to historic buildings and monuments.

In the United States, many state and local historic district commissions and review boards have regulations that require approval for both graffiti removal work and the application of coatings applied to the facades on designated landmarks or properties located in local historic districts. Alternatives to anti-graffiti barrier coatings include security measures such as night lighting and surveillance cameras, design strategies such as barrier plantings and fences, improved maintenance of the general area and rapid graffiti removal, as well as community awareness raising programs like a neighborhood watch.

== Use in charity ==
Anti-graffiti coatings are frequently used by a number of charities that use public installations to raise money for their respective causes. In cases where pieces of art and sculptures may be put out into the public, these coatings have been used to protect the pieces against graffiti attacks. These sculptures are protected by anti-graffiti coatings, often polysiloxane clear coatings so as to protect them from graffiti and weather damage.

== See also ==
- Anti-climb paint
- Anti-trespass panels
- Graffiti removal
