= Non-drying oil =

Oil which remains liquid on exposure to air

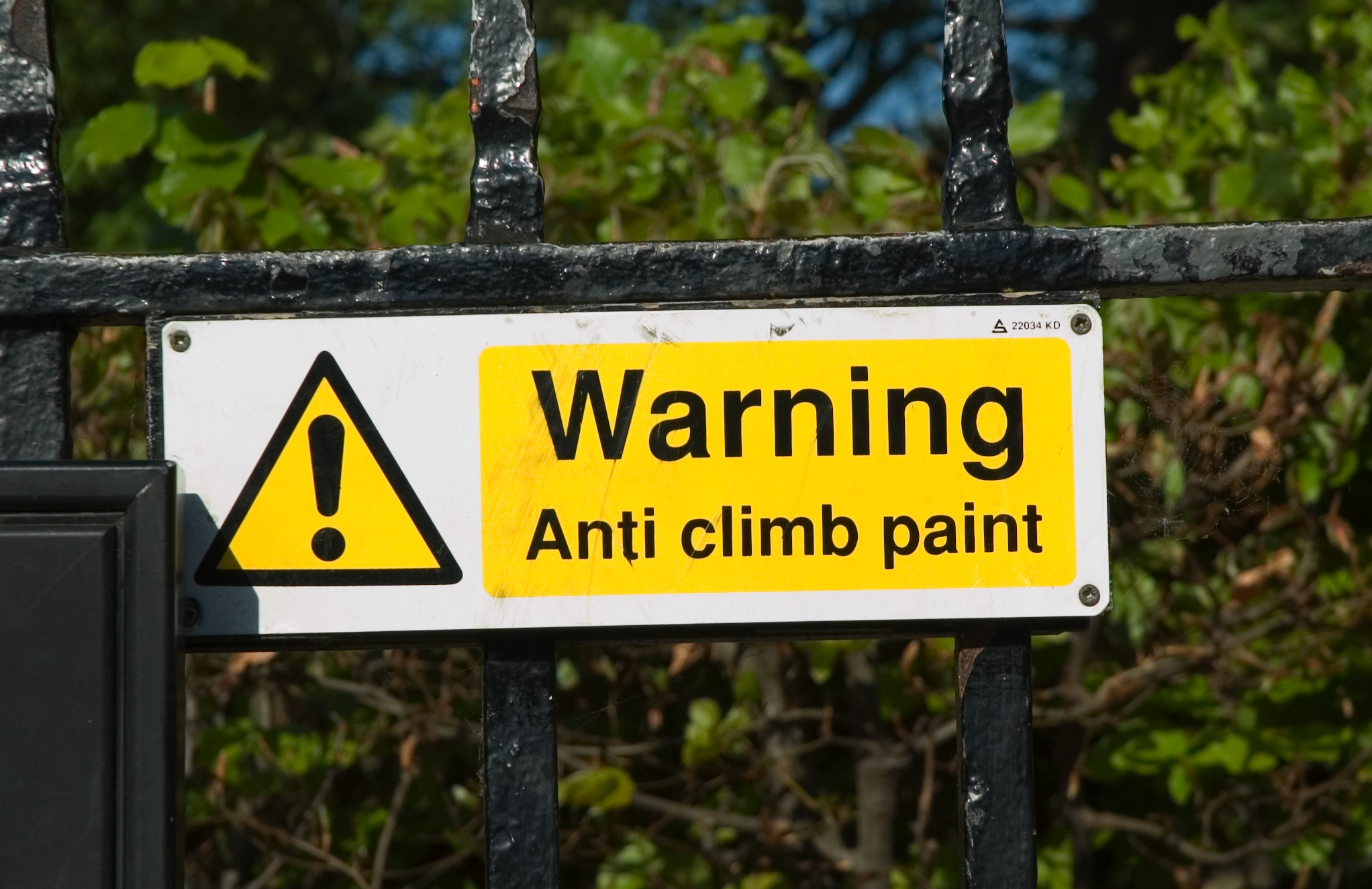
A warning sign for anti-climb paint, a type of paint based on non-drying oil

A non-drying oil is an oil which does not harden and remains liquid when it is exposed to air. This is as opposed to a drying oil, which hardens (through polymerization) completely, or a semi-drying oil, which partially hardens. Oils with an iodine number of less than 115 are considered non-drying.

== Uses ==
Non-drying oil is often used as a base in anti-climb paint, a type of slippery coating used to prevent climbing on its surface. Another use would be in baby oil.

== Examples ==
- Almond oil
- Babassu oil
- Baobab oil
- Castor oil
- Cocoa butter
- Coconut oil
- Colza oil
- Macadamia oil
- Nahar seed oil
- Mineral oil
- Olive oil
- Peanut oil
- Tea seed oil
- Tiger nut oil
- Petroleum
- Perilla oil
- Walnut oil
