= Semi-drying oil =

A semi-drying oil is an oil which partially hardens when it is exposed to air. This is as opposed to a drying oil, which hardens completely, or a non-drying oil, which does not harden at all. Oils with an iodine number of 115–130 are considered semi-drying.

== Examples of semi-drying oils ==
- Corn oil
- Cottonseed oil
- Sesame oil
- Grape seed oil
- Sunflower oil

== See also ==
- Oil paint
- Seasoning cast iron
