= Anti-suicide smock =

Garment designed to prevent suicide

- Other names: Safety smock, Ferguson, turtle suit, pickle suit, Bam Bam suit, suicide gown
- Type: Anti-suicide clothing

An anti-suicide smock is a tear-resistant single-piece outer garment that is generally used to prevent a hospitalized, incarcerated, or otherwise detained individual from using their clothing to die by suicide.

== Design ==
The smock is typically a simple, sturdily quilted, collarless, sleeveless gown with adjustable openings at the shoulders and down the front that are closed with nylon hook-and-loop or similar fasteners. The thickness of the garment makes it impossible to roll or fold the garment, so it cannot be used as a noose. The tough fabric, often a type of nylon, makes it difficult to rip the fabric into strips. The fabric is usually flame-resistant as well. Usually, the person wearing the anti-suicide smock wears no underwear or shoes.

The design is loose and does not restrict the wearer's movement. Often in the shape of a tunic, it provides some warmth, and can weigh about 4.5 pounds (2.0 kg). The color may be chosen for being pleasant or soothing, such as green or navy blue.

The cost is often around $300 each, and it is considered cost-effective compared to assigning a staff member to watch each suicidal person.

== History ==
Anti-suicide smocks were developed by Lonna Speer in 1989 while she was a nurse working in the Santa Cruz, California, county jail. Prior to the commercial production of anti-suicide smocks, many jails and prisons stripped inmates naked and held them in a stripped down-padded cell with no furniture or protrusions of any kind, because the only way to get safer clothing was to hand-make the padded smocks.

Anti-suicide smocks are now standard issue throughout jails and prisons in the United States. The American Correctional Association (ACA) has established the use of appropriate anti-suicide smocks and safety blankets as one of the standards used to judge jails and prisons for accreditation. Demand for anti-suicide smocks to meet this ACA standard led to multiple clothing makers creating similar garments of varying strength and of various materials.

== Related products ==
The same material is used for the anti-suicide blanket. In addition to the Safety Smock, Lonna Speer, who founded Ferguson Safety Products to produce them, also developed the Safety Blanket and the Safe Sleeping Bag, all made from the quilted heavy nylon material, as well as The Dozer (a suicide cell mattress), the Safety Pillow, and Safety Slippers.

Alternatives include thin disposable clothing.

== See also ==
- Anti-trespass panels
- Guantanamo Bay detention camp suicide attempts
- Suicide watch
