= Anti-suicide blanket =

Prison furnishing

An anti-suicide blanket is a tear-resistant blanket that is used to prevent a hospitalized, incarcerated or otherwise detained individual from forming a noose to commit suicide. The blanket is typically made of simple and sturdily quilted nylon or similarly reinforced material. The stiffness of the blanket makes it impossible to roll or fold without continuously applied pressure. The same material is used for the anti-suicide smock.

Suicide being a major cause of death of inmates globally, prisons have implemented "anti-suicide" blankets in attempts to decrease suicides within the facility. Not only are they implemented in prisons but also in hospitals and other mental rehabilitation centers. Providing an anti-suicide blanket has become the standard practice instead of increasing observation or providing programs for the mentally impaired because often times they use their own belongings on their own time when making an attempt to take their life. The blanket weighs about four and a half pounds and it is often worn without any other articles of clothing to further eliminate any other risks. While death by hanging is very common, it is known that some inmates will set articles of clothing on fire, but with the anti-suicide blanket, the material is so thick often times flames wither quickly. Nor do these blankets include anything of the same nature of a zipper or include any type of metal clasps, so if there is an emergency or a suicide attempt is made, the anti-suicide blanket can be easily removed from the person.

== See also ==
- Anti-trespass panels
- Guantanamo suicide attempts
