= Drying oil =

Oil that hardens after exposure to air

A drying oil is an oil that hardens to a tough, solid film after a period of exposure to air, at room temperature. The oil hardens through a chemical reaction in which the components crosslink (and hence polymerize) by the action of oxygen (not through the evaporation of water or other solvents). Drying oils are an important component of oil paint and some varnishes. Some commonly used drying oils include linseed oil, tung oil, poppy seed oil, perilla oil and walnut oil. The use of natural drying oils has declined over the past several decades, as they have been replaced by alkyd resins and other binders.

Since oxidation is the key to curing in these oils, those that are susceptible to chemical drying are often unsuitable for cooking, and are also highly susceptible to becoming rancid through autoxidation, the process by which fatty foods develop off-flavors. Rags, cloth, and paper saturated with drying oils may spontaneously combust (ignite) after a few hours as heat is released during the oxidation process.

== Chemistry of the drying process ==
The "drying", hardening, or, more properly, curing of oils is the result of autoxidation, the addition of oxygen to an organic compound and the subsequent crosslinking. This process begins with an oxygen molecule (O_{2}) in the air inserting into carbon-hydrogen (C-H) bonds adjacent to one of the double bonds within the unsaturated fatty acid. The resulting hydroperoxides are susceptible to crosslinking reactions. Bonds form between the fatty acid chains, resulting in a polymer network, often visible by formation of a skin-like film on samples. This polymerization results in stable films that, while somewhat elastic, do not flow or deform readily. Diene-containing fatty acid derivatives, such as those derived from linoleic acid, are especially prone to this reaction because they generate pentadienyl radicals. Monounsaturated fatty acids, such as oleic acid, are slower to undergo drying because the allylic radical intermediates are less stable (i.e., slower to form).

Simplified chemical reactions associated with cobalt-catalyzed drying process. In the first step, the diene undergoes autoxidation to give a hydroperoxide. In the second step, the hydroperoxide combines with another unsaturated side chain to generate a crosslink.

The early stages of the drying process can be monitored by weight changes in an oil film. The film becomes heavier as it absorbs oxygen. Linseed oil, for instance, increases in weight by 17 percent. As oxygen uptake ceases, the weight of the film declines as volatile compounds evaporate. As the oil ages, further transitions occur. A large number of the original ester bonds in the oil molecules undergo hydrolysis, releasing individual fatty acids. In the case of paints, some portion of these free fatty acids (FFAs) react with metals in the pigment, producing metal carboxylates. Together, the various non-cross-linking substances associated with the polymer network constitute the mobile phases. Unlike the molecules that are part of the network itself, they are capable of moving and diffusing within the film, and can be removed using heat or a solvent. The mobile phase may play a role in plasticizing paint films, preventing them from becoming too brittle. Carboxyl groups in the polymers of the stationary phase ionize, becoming negatively charged and form complexes with metal cations present in the pigment. The original network, with its nonpolar, covalent bonds, is replaced by an ionomeric structure, held together by ionic interactions. The structure of these ionomeric networks is not well understood.

Most drying oils rapidly increase in viscosity after heating in the absence of air. If the oil is subjected to raised temperatures for a long time, it will become a rubbery oil-insoluble substance.

=== Role of metal catalysts ===
The drying process is accelerated by certain metal salts. These so-called oil drying agents are often naphthenic acid derivatives of cobalt, manganese, or iron. Functioning as homogeneous catalysts these lipophilic transition metal carboxylates speed up the reduction of the hydroperoxide intermediates. A series of additional reactions ensues. Each step produces free radicals, which then engage in further crosslinking. The process finally ends when pairs of free radicals combine. The polymerization occurs over a period of days to years and renders the film dry to the touch.

Premature action of the drying agents causes the formation of a "skin." For paints, skinning is undesirable but can be suppressed by the addition of antiskinning agents such as methylethyl ketone oxime, which evaporate when the paint/oil is applied to a surface.

== Composition ==
Representative triglyceride found in a drying oil. The triester is derived from three different unsaturated fatty acids, linoleic (top), alpha-linolenic (middle), and oleic acids (bottom). The order of drying rate is alpha-linolenic > linoleic > oleic acid, reflecting their degree of unsaturation.

Drying oils consist of glycerol triesters of fatty acids. These esters are characterized by high levels of polyunsaturated fatty acids, especially alpha-linolenic acid. One common measure of the "siccative" (drying) property of oils is iodine number, which is an indicator of the number of double bonds in the oil. Oils with an iodine number greater than 130 are considered drying, those with an iodine number of 115–130 are semi-drying, and those with an iodine number of less than 115 are non-drying.

== Safety ==
Rags, cloth, and paper saturated with drying oils may combust spontaneously (ignite) due to heat released during the curing process. This hazard is greater when oil-soaked materials are folded, bunched, or piled together, which allows heat to accumulate and accelerate the reaction. Precautions include: wetting rags with water and spreading them away from direct sunlight; keeping them in air-tight fireproof metal containers; immersing them in water inside air-tight metal containers designed for such applications; or storing them immersed in solvents in suitable closed containers. Leaving linseed-oil-soaked rags in a pile after refinishing woodwork was the cause of a 1991 fire in Philadelphia's One Meridian Plaza, a 38-story office building, which resulted in severe structural damage, and eventually the demolition of the building.

== See also ==
- Blown oil
- Danish oil
- Fat over lean
- Linoleum
- Wood finishing
- Varnish
- Non-drying oil
