= Blown oil =

A blown oil is a drying oil which has been modified through an oxidative process.

== Description ==
Oils are "blown" through partial oxidation of the oil at elevated temperatures. A typical blowing process involves heating the oil to 70 to 120 °C (158 to 248 °F) and passing air through the liquid. The modification causes the formation of C-O-C and C-C cross links, and hydroxyl and carboxyl functional groups.

Blown oils are chemically different from oils modified only by heating, which are known as stand oils.

Some common types of oils that can be blown include linseed oil, rapeseed oil, castor oil and soybean oil.
