= Graffiti removal =

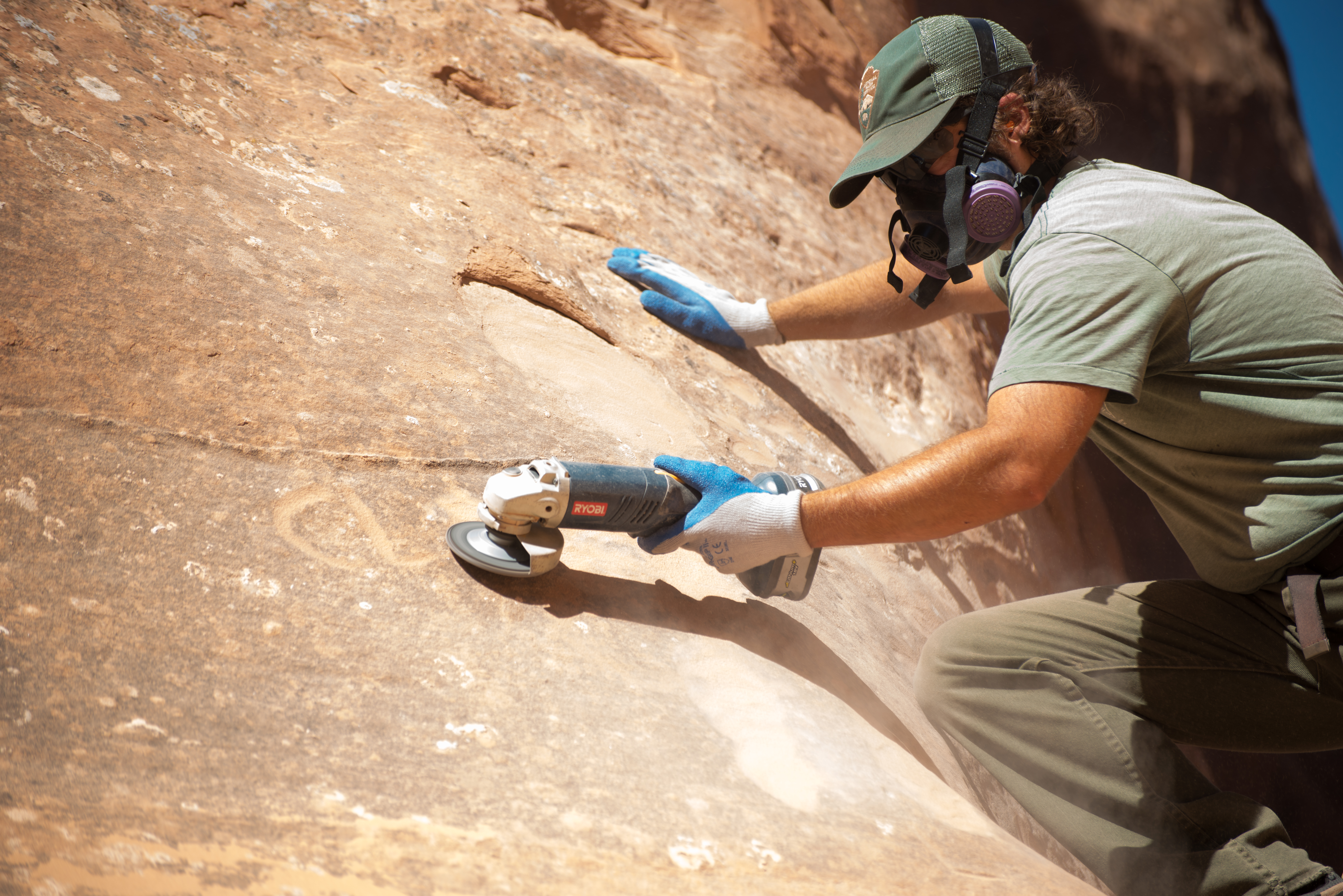
Arches National Park staff member using a grinder to remove graffiti

Graffiti has long been considered an act of vandalism that signifies urban decay and a detriment to property values in an area. Therefore, most governments have seen graffiti as detrimental, and have outlawed the practice. However, due to most instances of graffiti occurring in public spaces, local governments are responsible for graffiti removal in order to maintain the beautification of their local shire, council or city.

== Graffiti as a negative externality ==
Results of graffiti removal on a squatted building in Poznań, 2013

Governments see graffiti as a negative externality because it largely inhibits or detracts from the beautification of a local community. This can often stigmatise a neighbourhood or community through being labelled as a low socio-economic area. Indeed, this converts to suppressed housing prices and has strong correlations with local crime and gang activities. Considering the great cost graffiti incurs on local communities, governments take the burden of the negative externality, through removal. Due to the nature of graffiti, it is near impossible to eliminate, despite changes to legislation to increase the fine for committing such offences.

See also: Broken windows theory

== Removal methods ==
Governments take different approaches to graffiti removal, often depending on their resources. These approaches have been developed and shifted due to larger movements within the cleaning industry, costs of supplies and the end results of removals.

=== Paint out ===
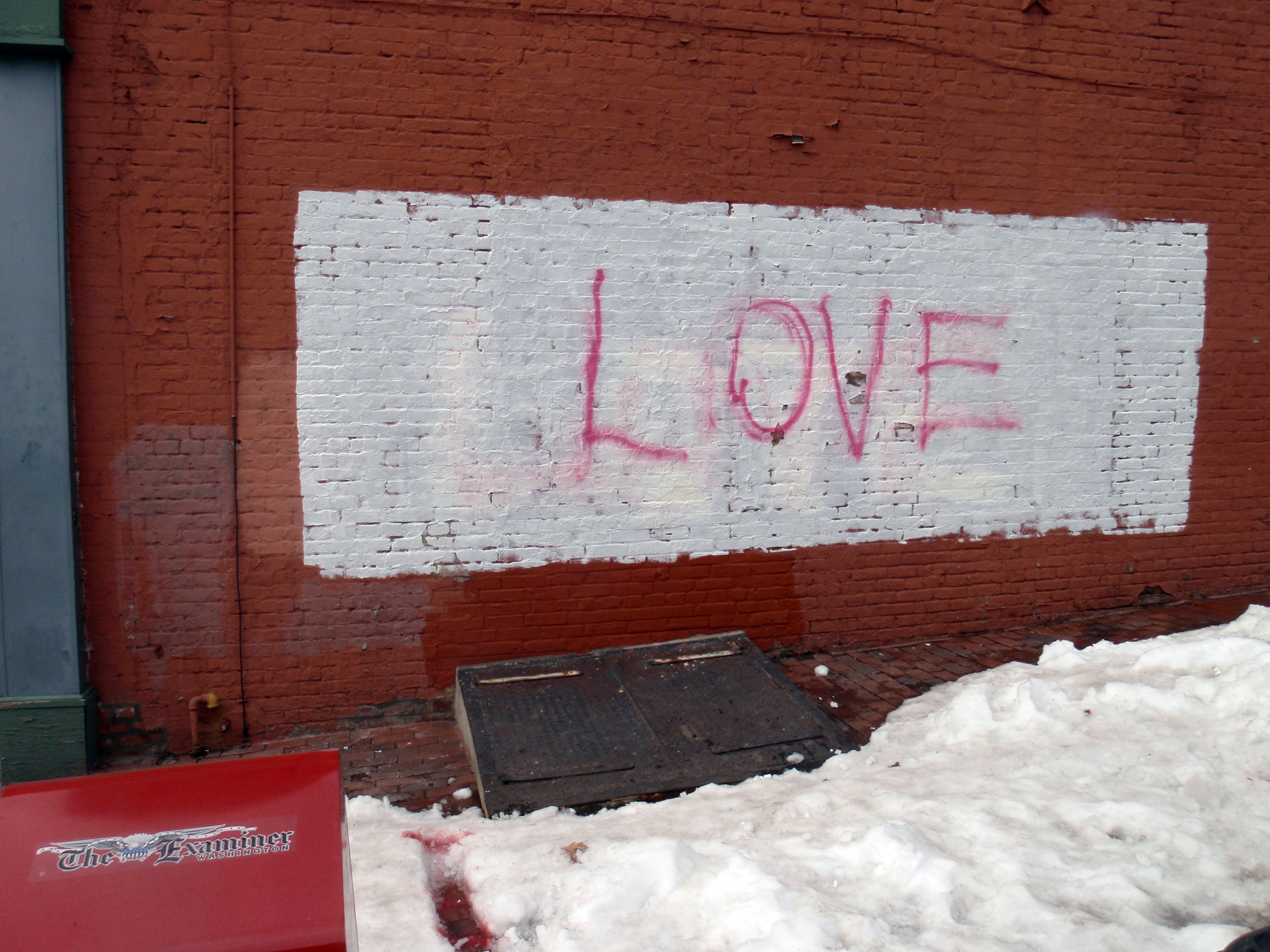
A white block of paint covering graffiti, which has then been graffitied on top of

This method involves painting over the graffiti so that it can no longer be seen. This is considered a low costs method and has historically been used widely by governments. However, over time the negative effects of this removal method begin to surface. Although effective for already painted walls, this removal option often leads to poor results on other surfaces, as it appears out of place and develops a "patchwork effect" on the surface. Furthermore, if this method is used regularly on the same wall or surface, the paint begins to peel, leading to the method being an ineffective long-term strategy for graffiti removal.

=== Chemical removal ===
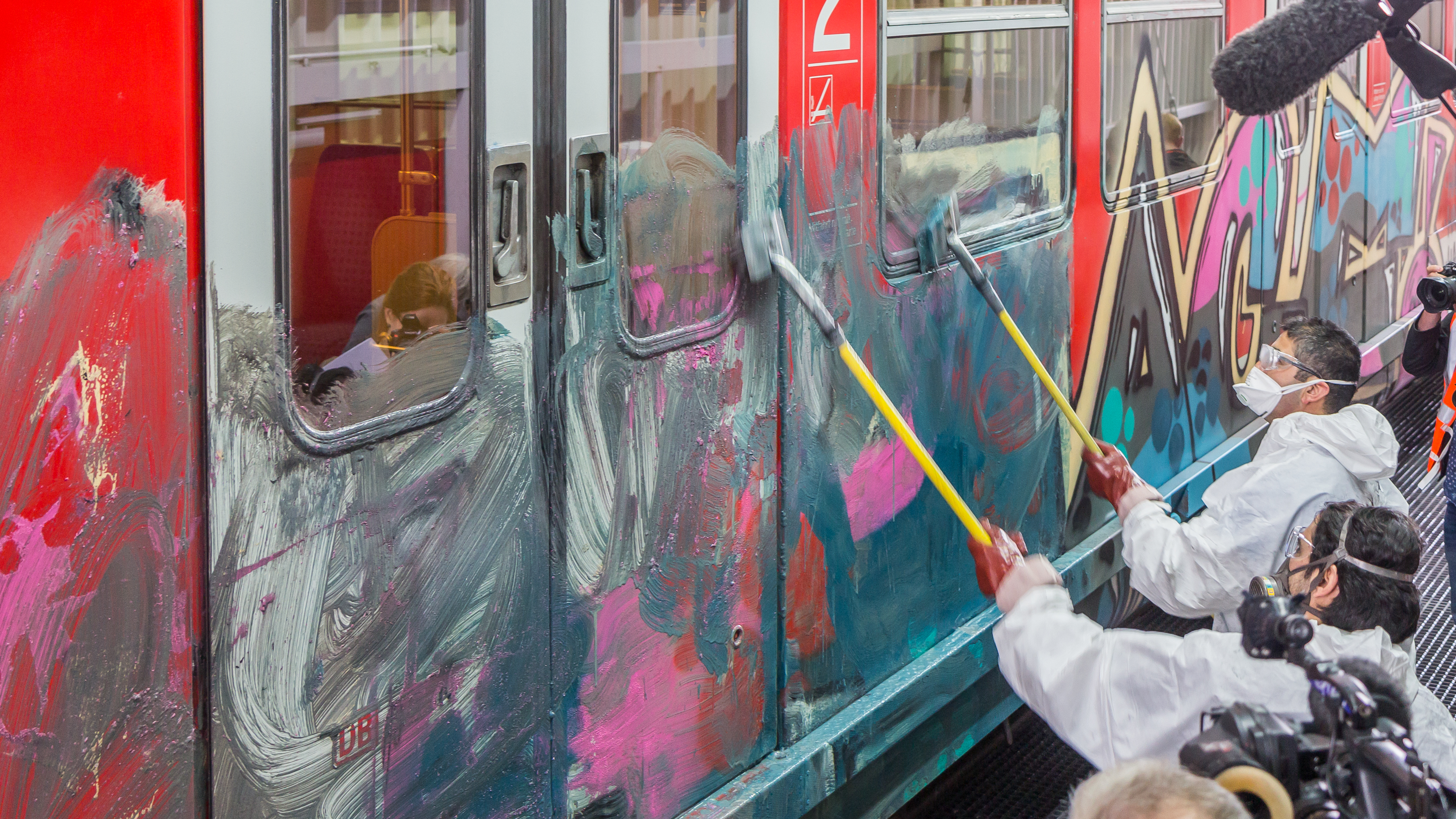
Chemical removal of graffiti from a train in Germany

This method actually removes the graffiti in earnest. These are cleaning products with active chemicals which remove the graffiti from the surface. These methods are largely effective. However, with poor application of the chemical, this approach has been found to damage the surface, especially painted surfaces. In these cases the paint along with the graffiti is stripped, leading to a poor result. In addition, the increasing prevalence of environmental sustainability makes this method an increasingly outdated method of removal.

=== Mechanics of graffiti removal ===
There are four controllable factors that should be understood when removing graffiti.

- Time – The longer the contact time the deeper the graffiti remover will penetrate. The more sensitive the surface the shorter the time the graffiti remover can stay on the surface.
- Temperature – Warmer weather speeds up the rate in which the graffiti remover products operate.
- Agitation – When graffiti removal products are applied by means of hard bristled brushes or scourers, it assists in breaking the bond between the graffiti and the surface. NOTE: be careful on sensitive surfaces, otherwise the underlying surface may be damaged.
- Chemical – Use the right chemical for the task at hand. To compensate for any reduction in one of these for variables increase one of the other variables i.e. Should the temperature be cold, increase the contact time between the graffiti and the graffiti remover, alternatively you could increase the temperature, by using a hot water pressure washing system.

=== Environmentally sustainable removal ===
This method involves using organic products which remove the graffiti from the surface. This approach is comparable in cost to a chemical or paint out removal, and often have the benefit of lower or no safety and health risk.

Baking Soda or Dry Ice Blasting is an environmentally sustainable method of removing graffiti. This process involves using abrasive particles to safely remove the paint without damaging surfaces. Surfaces that respond well to blasting are concrete, brick, stone, wood, and glass.

=== Graffiti on historic surfaces ===
Many graffiti removal methods involve abrasive processes (wire-brushing, grit blasting, etc.) or the use of powerful and potentially hazardous chemical solvents, which may damage historic fabric such as the stone facade of a historic building. Laser cleaning (using lasers of the Nd: YAG wavelength), although more expensive, is likely to be more appropriate for historic stonework. Some chemical cleaning agents can also be used with an inert poultice material, in which case the chemical is usually applied first to dissolve the pigment, followed by the poultice to draw the pigment in solution out of the substrate. Removal of graffiti from historic surfaces and objects should only be undertaken by appropriately trained and skilled personnel.

== Management ==
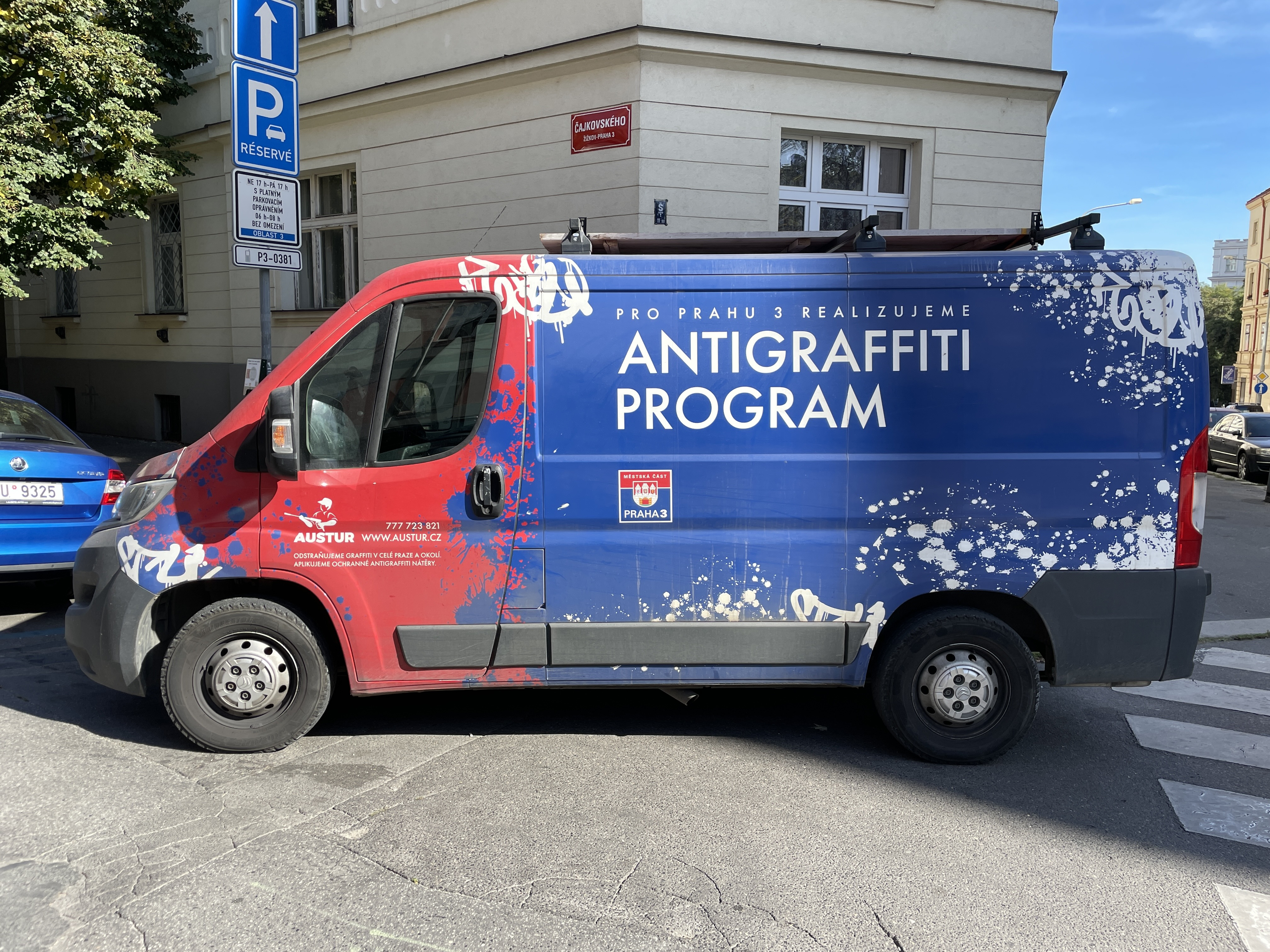
Anti graffiti car in Prague

Governments have found that the faster a piece of graffiti is removed, the less future graffiti occurs in that location. As a result, several different graffiti removal management methods have been developed to locate and remove graffiti efficiently.

=== Reactive ===
Governments cannot organize the removal of graffiti until they are aware of the graffiti that exists. The Reactive Removal Method relies on the government waiting for calls from concerned citizens. There are various community programs which assist in raising awareness of graffiti to prompt removal. This method is effective in non-regular cases, and in neighbourhoods with concerned and persistent citizens, however for locations with chronic levels of graffiti are rarely reported. This is due to the assumed futility of reporting the graffiti.

=== Proactive ===
Governments with more foresight and resources include an inspection regimen with their graffiti removal management. These inspections highlight graffiti offences faster than Reactive Removal Management. This method has been adopted in most major cities, where there are great enough economies of scale to make this kind of operation viable.

In addition to inspections, Proactive Removal Management uses sealants to protect graffiti-prone locations. Sealants protect the surface and significantly reduce the cost of removing the graffiti from the surface. Initially, these were only available for painted surfaces, but products have been designed to protect a range of surfaces, such as brick and concrete.

=== Predictive ===
A new and emerging approach to graffiti removal management is Predictive Removal Management. This involves the use of a database of information regarding graffiti incidents within a city. This is often developed by the government or the graffiti removal service provider. This database is then data mined to determine patterns in graffiti offences. This can then be used to tailor more accurate inspections, as well as allow authorities to allocate resources more efficiently. This reduces the time taken to find and remove graffiti.
