= Walnut oil =

Oil extracted from walnuts, Juglans regia

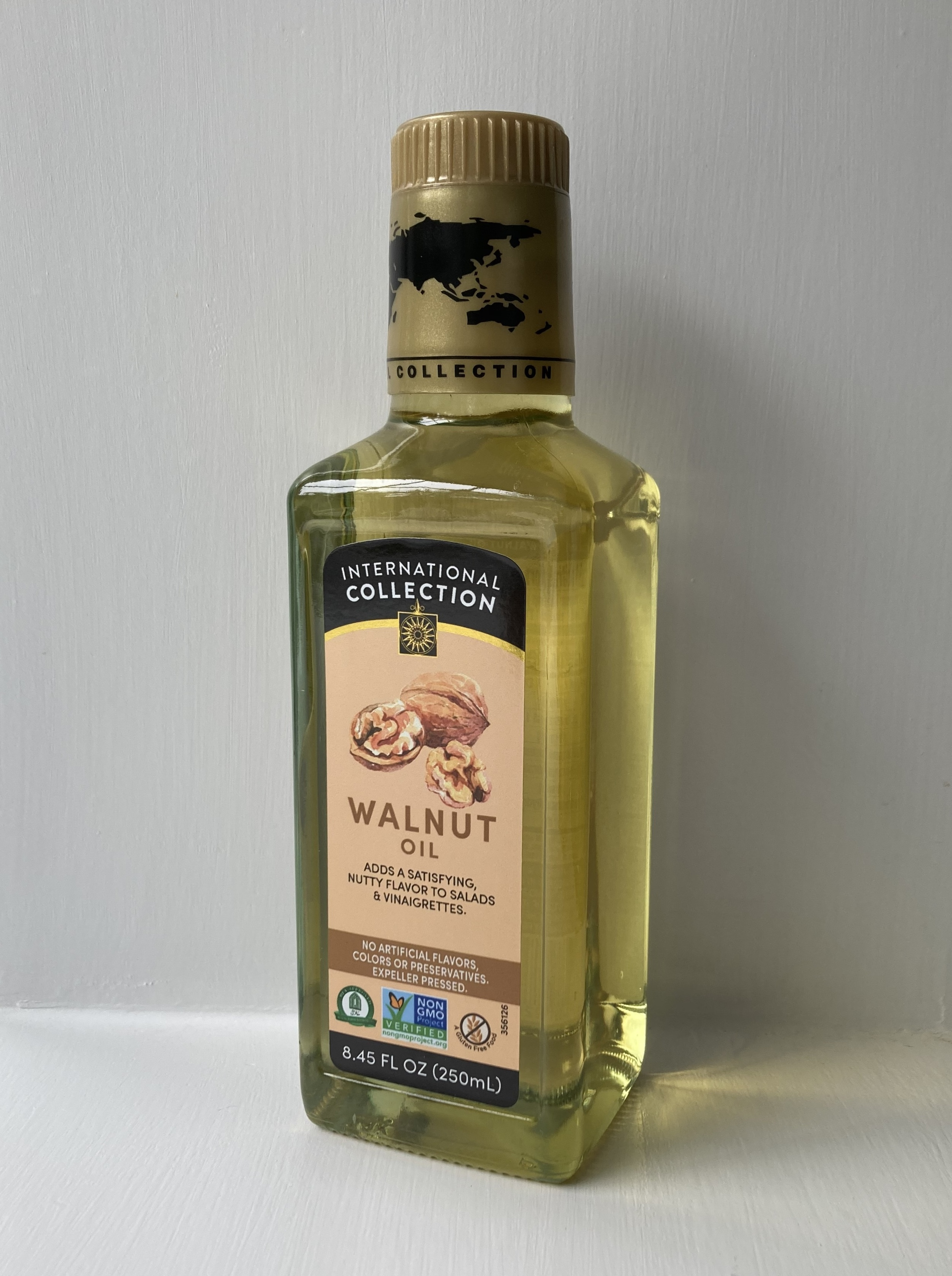
A bottle of walnut oil

Walnut oil is oil extracted from walnuts, Juglans regia. The oil contains polyunsaturated fatty acids, monounsaturated fatty acids, and saturated fats.

== Composition ==
Virgin walnut oil consists of polyunsaturated fatty acids (72% of total fats), particularly alpha-linolenic acid (14%) and linoleic acid (58%), oleic acid (13%), and saturated fats (9%). It contains aldehydes, tocopherol, and many phenolic compounds, including tannins, ellagic acid, and flavonoids.

== Culinary use ==
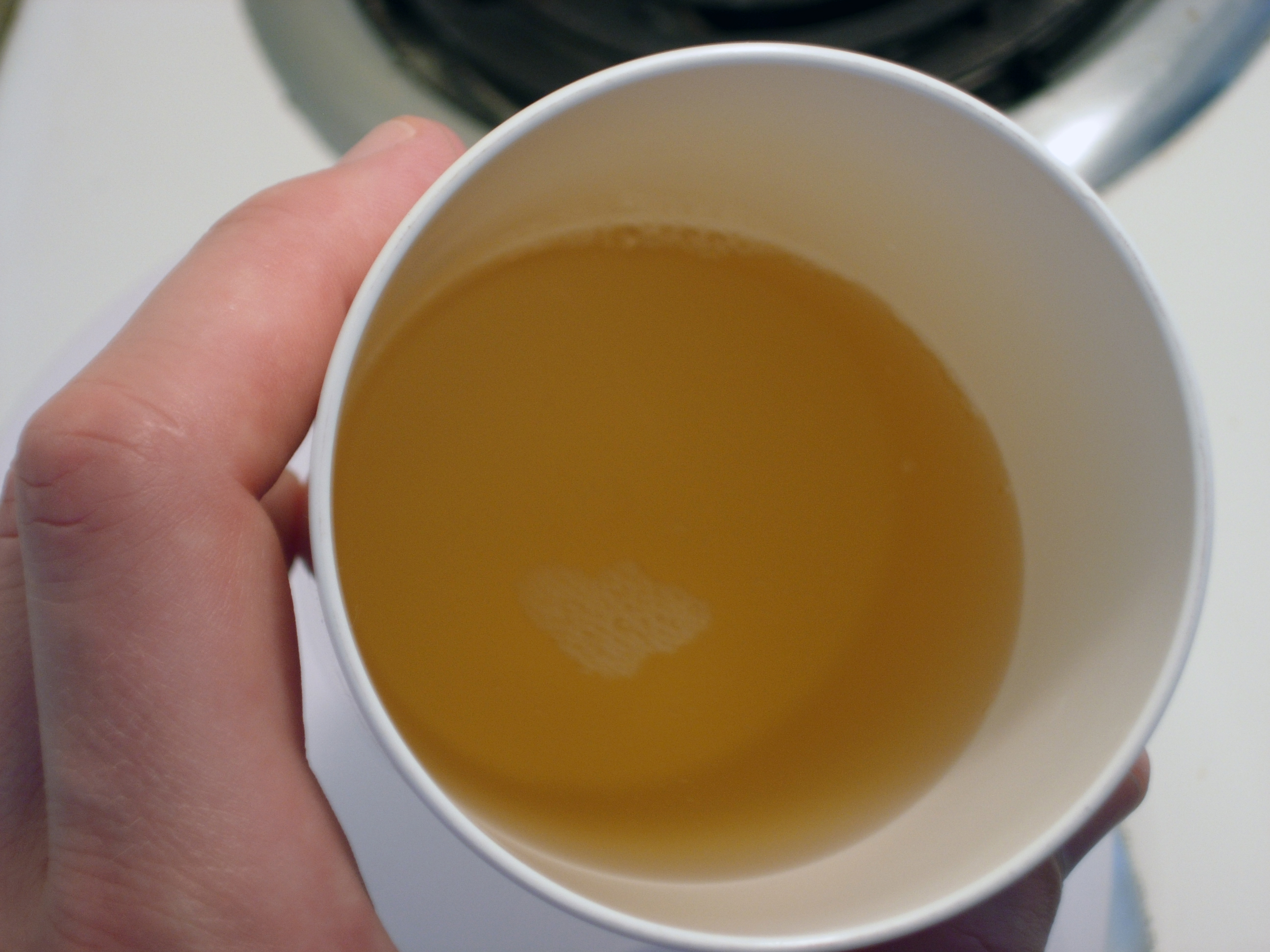
A cup of California roasted walnut oil

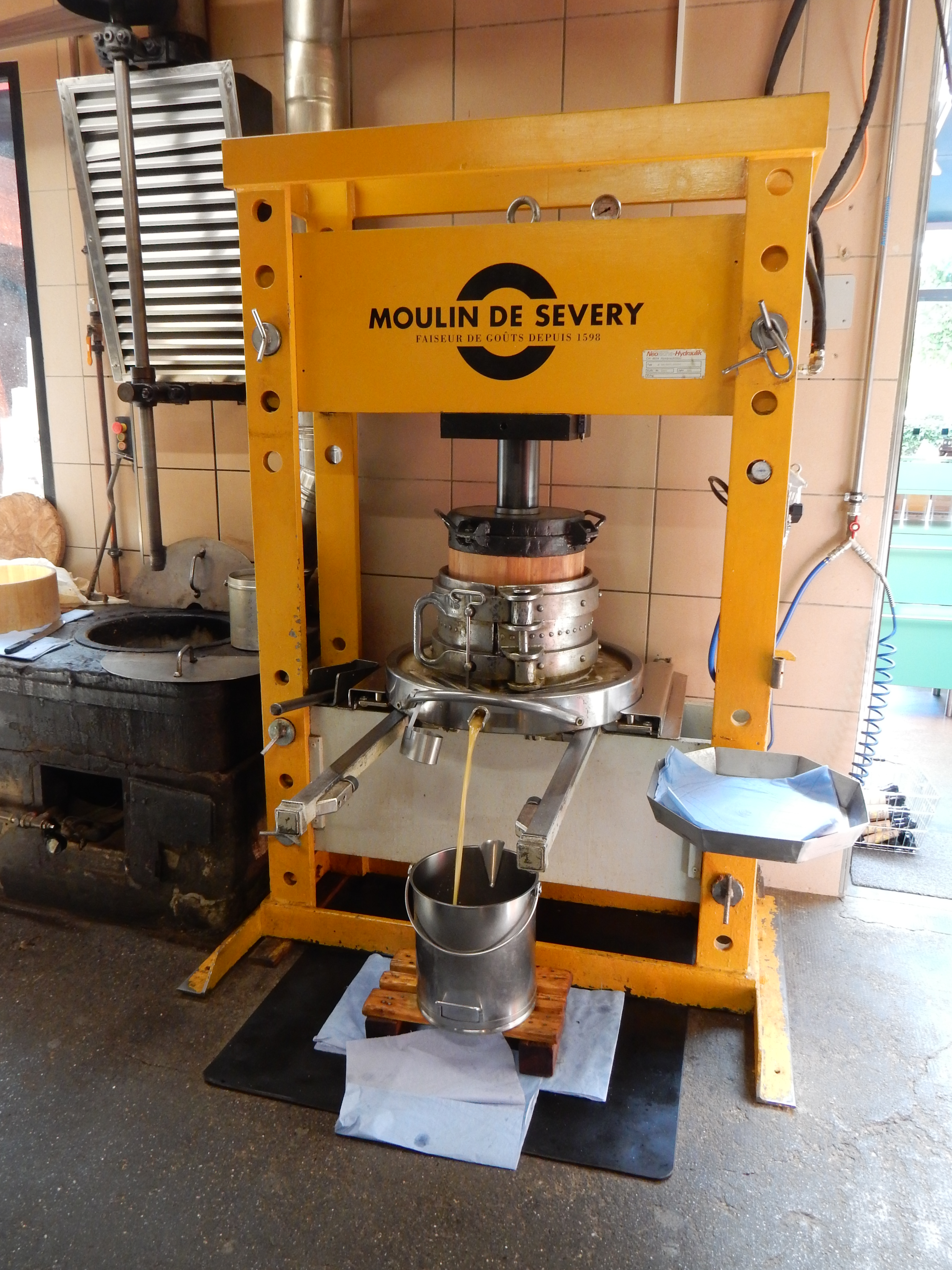
Pressing the nuts under high pressure

Walnut oil is edible and is generally used less than other oils in food preparation, often due to high pricing. It is light-coloured and delicate in flavour and scent, with a nutty quality. Although chefs sometimes use walnut oil for pan-frying, most avoid walnut oil for high-temperature cooking because heating tends to reduce the oil's flavour and produce a slight bitterness. Walnut oil is preferred in cold dishes such as salad dressings.

Cold-pressed walnut oil is typically more expensive due to the loss of a higher percentage of the oil. Refined walnut oil is expeller-pressed and saturated with solvent to extract the highest percentage of oil available in the nut meat. The solvents are subsequently eliminated by heating the mixture to around 400 °F (200 °C). Both methods produce food-grade culinary oils. Walnut oil, like all nut, seed and vegetable oils can turn rancid.

Over 99% of walnut oil sold in the US is produced in California.

== Artistic use ==
Linoleic acid, the major component of walnut oil, is a "drying oil", which means that in air it polymerizes, forming strong but flexible films, useful in oil paints and varnishes. Walnut oil was one of the most important oils used by Renaissance painters. Its short drying time and lack of yellow tint make it a good oil paint base thinner and brush cleaner.

Some woodworkers favour walnut oil as a finish for implements that will come in contact with food, such as wooden bowls, because of its safety. Rancidity is not an issue because walnut oil dries when applied to wood in a thin coating. People who mix oil and wax to formulate wood finishes value walnut oil as an ingredient because of the edibility of both ingredients. The oil typically is combined with beeswax in a mixture of 1/3 oil to 2/3 beeswax.
