= Anti-climb paint =

Non-drying paint designed to deter climbing

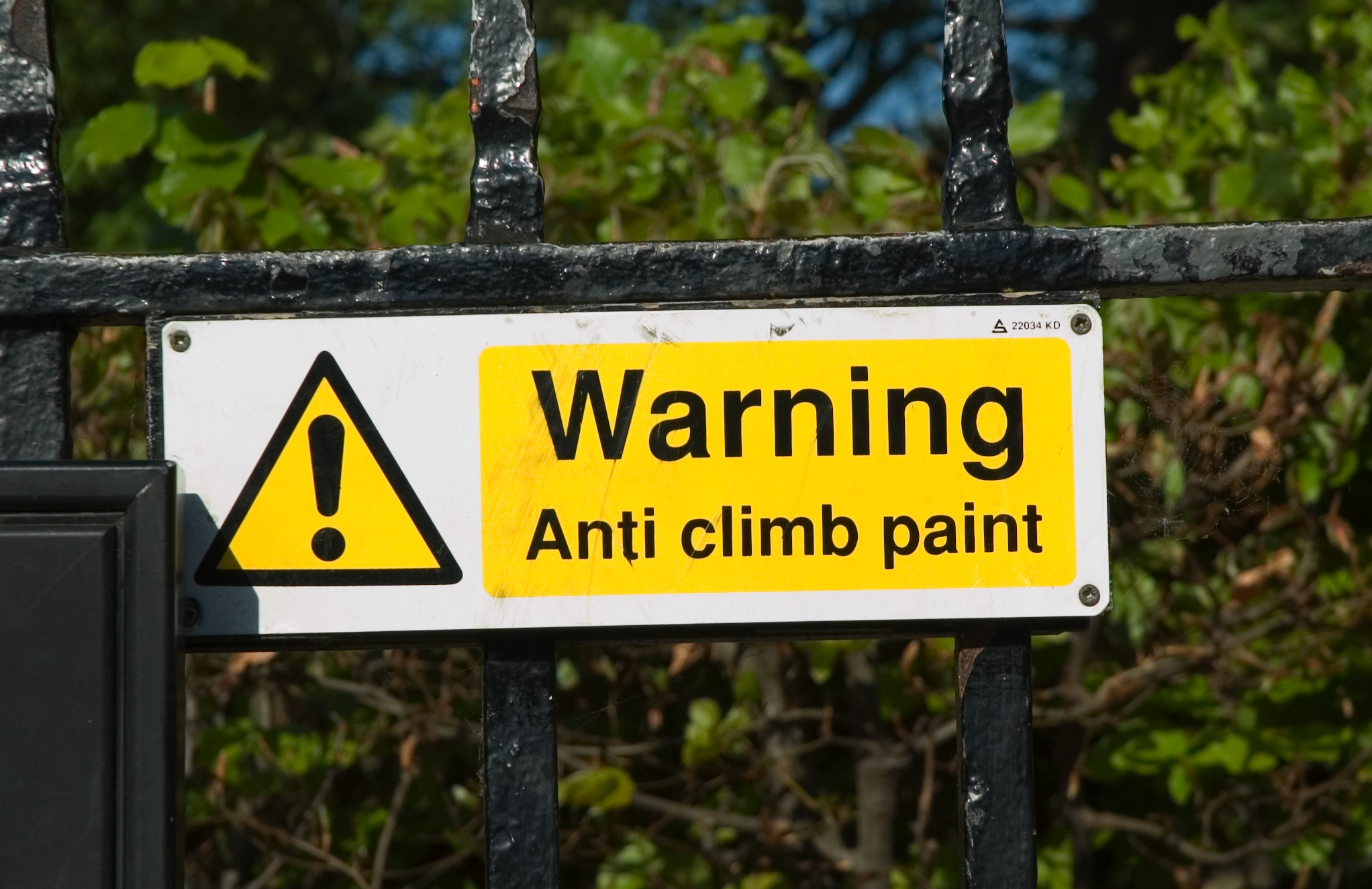
A sign on a fence in Greenwich, England, advising of the use of anti-climb paint

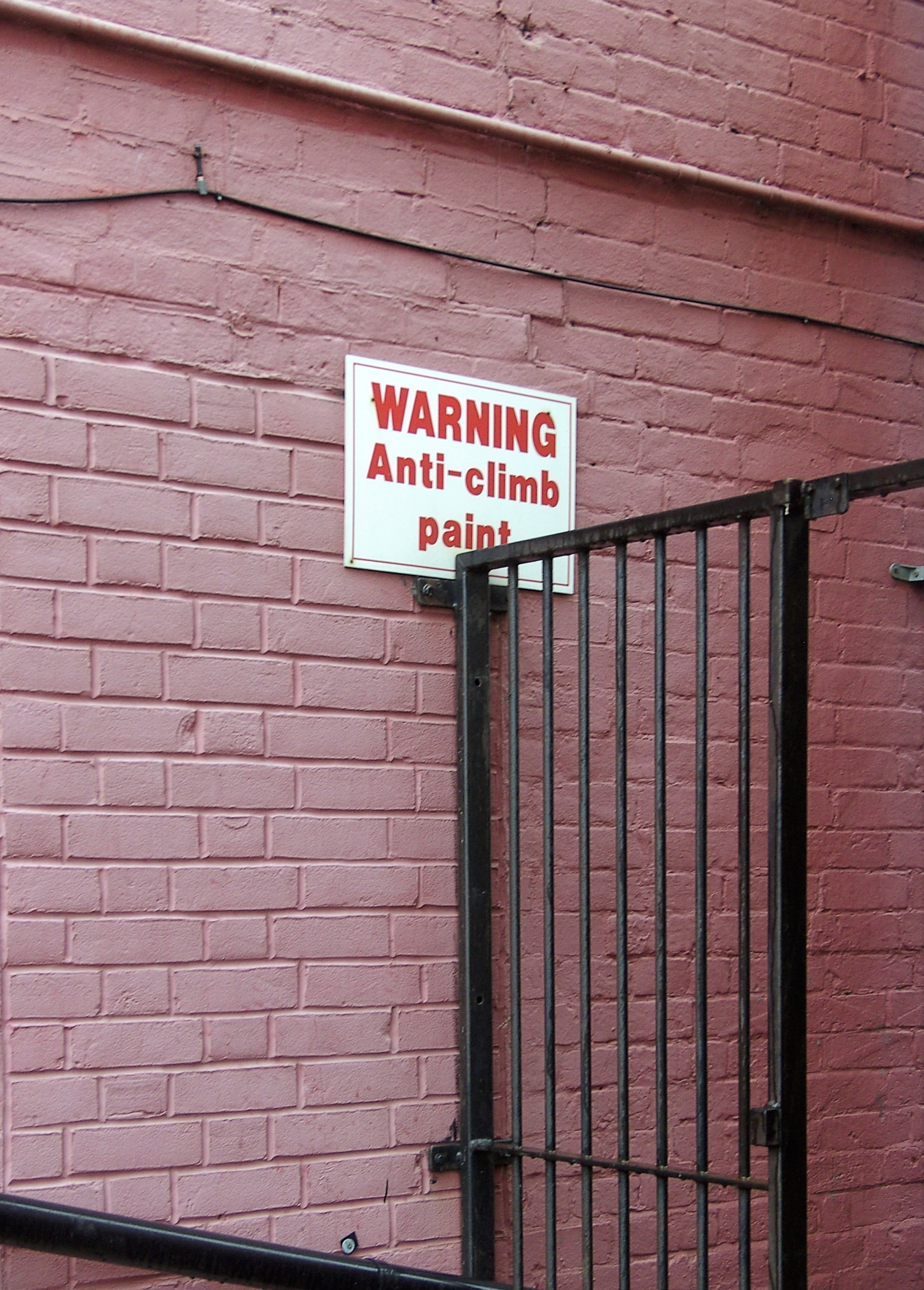
Anti-climb paint on a gate in the UK

Anti-climb paint (also known as non-drying paint, anti-intruder paint, anti-vandal grease) is a class of paint consisting of a thick oily coating that is applied with a stiff brush, trowel or by hand using a protective glove. In appearance it is similar to smooth gloss paint when applied but it remains slippery for a minimum of three years, thereby hindering an intruder from gaining a foothold.

== Uses ==
It is used to prevent climbing on objects such as lamp posts, walls and fences. It owes its effectiveness to the fact that it is based on a non-drying oil and keeps the surface greasy and slippery. As an additional advantage, it leaves its mark on the person touching it and hence makes it possible for intruders to be identified.

Anti-climb paint is often used to deter burglars seeking to enter a building by climbing up to a higher entry point, such as a window on an upper floor.

== Characteristics ==
Anti-climb paint continues to work in hot or cold weather conditions, adhering to the surfaces to which it is applied.

It can be used on most building materials. It is particularly effective in preventing climbing on walls, parapets, boundary fences, down pipes, lamp standards and roofs.

The paint's outer surface may appear to be dry, but attempting to climb over it will reveal the soft paint underneath. It has an effective lifetime of around three years, after which a fresh coat is usually recommended.

It cannot be easily washed off and is resistant to removal by a variety of chemicals.

== Safety ==
To keep the general public from being affected by the paint, it is usually applied above a certain height on the object being painted. Typically it is applied from a height of 8 ft / 2.4 meters above the ground.

== History ==
It was developed by Camrex Paints in the early 1960s.

== See also ==
- Anti-graffiti coating
