= Levkas =

Within the field of icon painting, levkas is the mixture of fine alabaster powder, calcium sulfate (a form of gypsum), or calcium carbonate (chalk) along with glue (often rabbit skin glue, sometimes fish glue derived from the bladder of a sturgeon) applied in layers to a surface prior to gilding that surface with gold leaf or painting it, similar to gesso. The levkas is a bright white color which allows the colors of the paint to appear their brightest. As many as six to seven layers may be applied in preparation for the painting of a religious icon. A painting or icon whose surface has been damaged may have lost some of its layers of levkas.

The word derives from the Greek word "leukos" which means "white", and is derived from the name of the Greek island sometimes referred to by the same name which was the source of much of the white chalk used for creating this mixture.
