= Support (art) =

Surface created for a painting

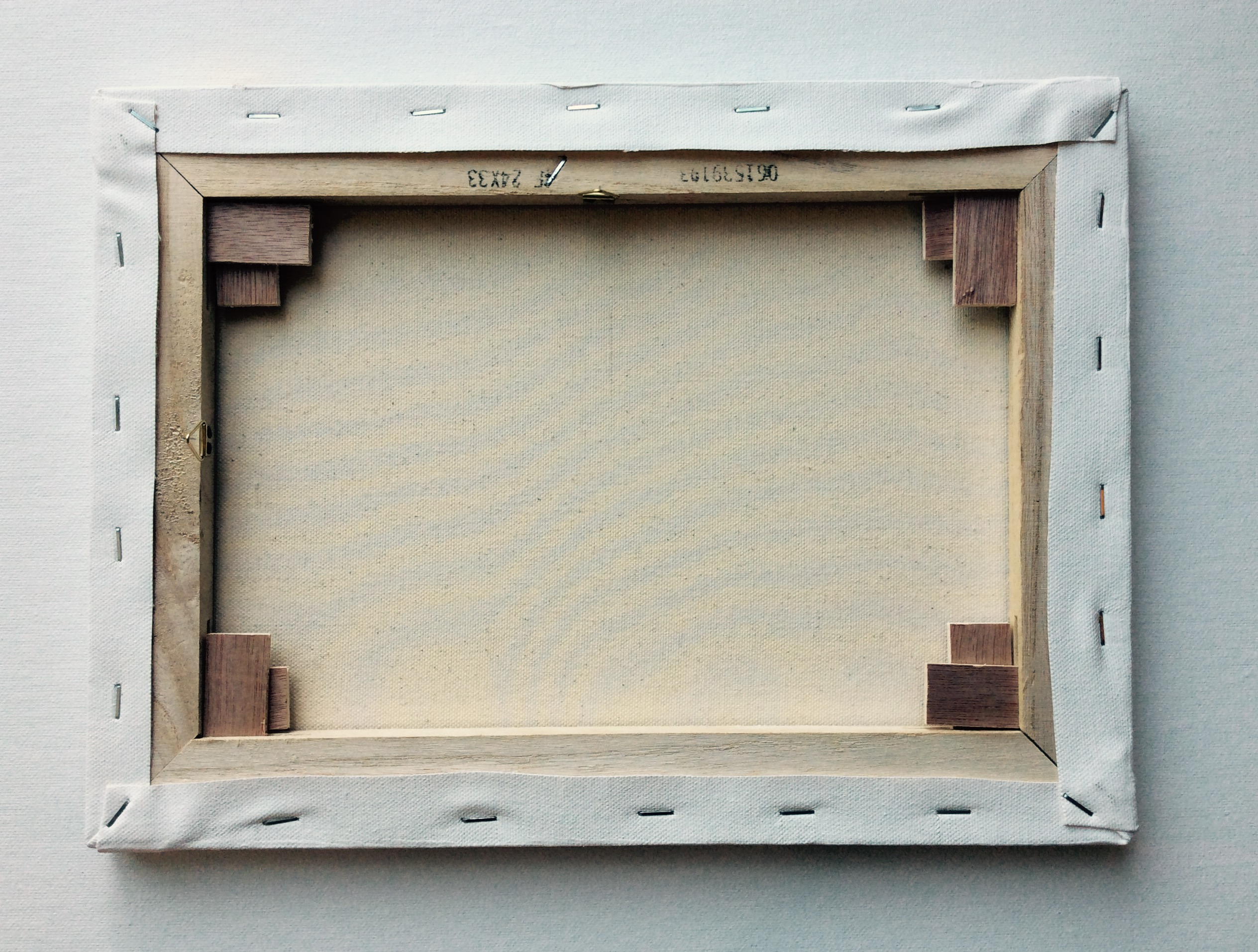
Back side of a stretched canvas support

In visual arts, the support is the solid surface on which the work is painted, typically a canvas or a panel. Support is technically distinct from the overlaying ground. Sometimes "ground" is used in a broad sense of "support" to designate any surface used for painting, for example, paper for watercolor or plaster for fresco.

The support for an oil painting can be either rigid or flexible, both providing certain opportunities and challenges for the artist. In order to get both the stability and the desired texture, painters for finished paintings usually use canvas that are pre-stretched on a solid frame or panel (so-called stretchers usually made of stretcher bars). These stretched canvas became popular in Venice in the 17th century. Since these supports are expensive, studies are frequently executed on pieces of canvas or paper. Canvas board, a piece of canvas mounted onto a paper board, provides another low-cost alternative for sketches.

The hardwood (oak, birch, poplar) panel was the original choice of support for painters in the ancient times. Masonite is the modern engineered wood that is also used for painting. Many contemporary artists still use panels due to their smooth surface and stability that simplify painting of the small details.

Acrylic paint is forgiving in the terms of support: it is more flexible and sticks to the surfaces better. Therefore, in addition to the traditional supports, the cloth made from polyester (untreated) or glass fiber would work, as would metals, leather, glass, and slate. Encaustic is not flexible and requires porous or textured surface, so the canvas on open stretchers will not work, but (scratched) metals and abraded sculptures will. Tempera is not flexible and requires the use of a board.

== Types of support ==
=== Fabrics ===
The oldest known use of fabrics (linen) as a painting support dates back to the Dynasty XII in Egypt (2000 BC). The continuous use can be traced in both Europe and Asia. In medieval Europe fabrics was overtaken by the wood panels for church use; Renaissance, with its wider spread of paintings, saw wide use of canvas, occasionally glued to the wood, a practice that originated in the Ancient Egypt, but became very popular in the 13th-15th centuries in Italy, with paper sometimes used as a ground layer. The modern practice is to stretch the canvas on a wooden frame.

Fabric made of glass fiber has an advantage of being mold-resistant, but is brittle when sized.

Fabrics are relatively fragile and deteriorate with time, so the relining (gluing of another layer of fabric to the back of the original canvas) is used for the last few centuries.

==== Canvas board ====
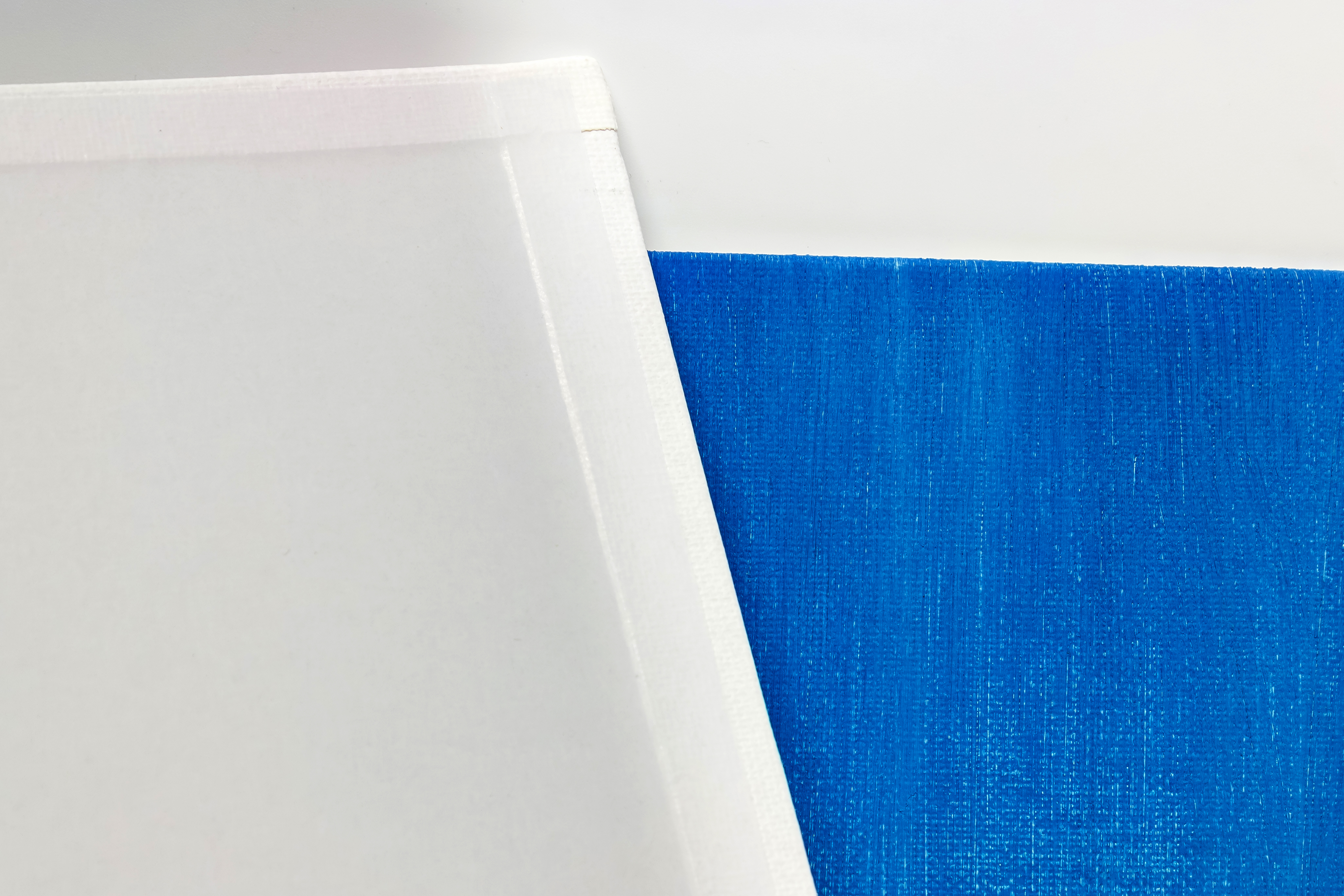
Two canvas boards, cotton canvas mounted onto a paper board and primed with ground layer of white and blue paint.

Canvas board is a piece of canvas mounted onto a paper board, typically used as a low-cost alternative for sketches, amateurs, and students. It is also known under the name "mill board", and, if coated with the ground layer. The mill boards were manufactured since at least the end of the 18th century, originally as pasteboards made of cheap fibres, academy boards started to appear in catalogs around the middle of the 19th century. The canvas board, with ground-coated canvas attached to a side of a paperboard, arrived in late 1870s. Yet another option, a paper board with surface grained to imitate canvas, appeared in the late 1880s under the name "Rushmore board".

=== Wood ===
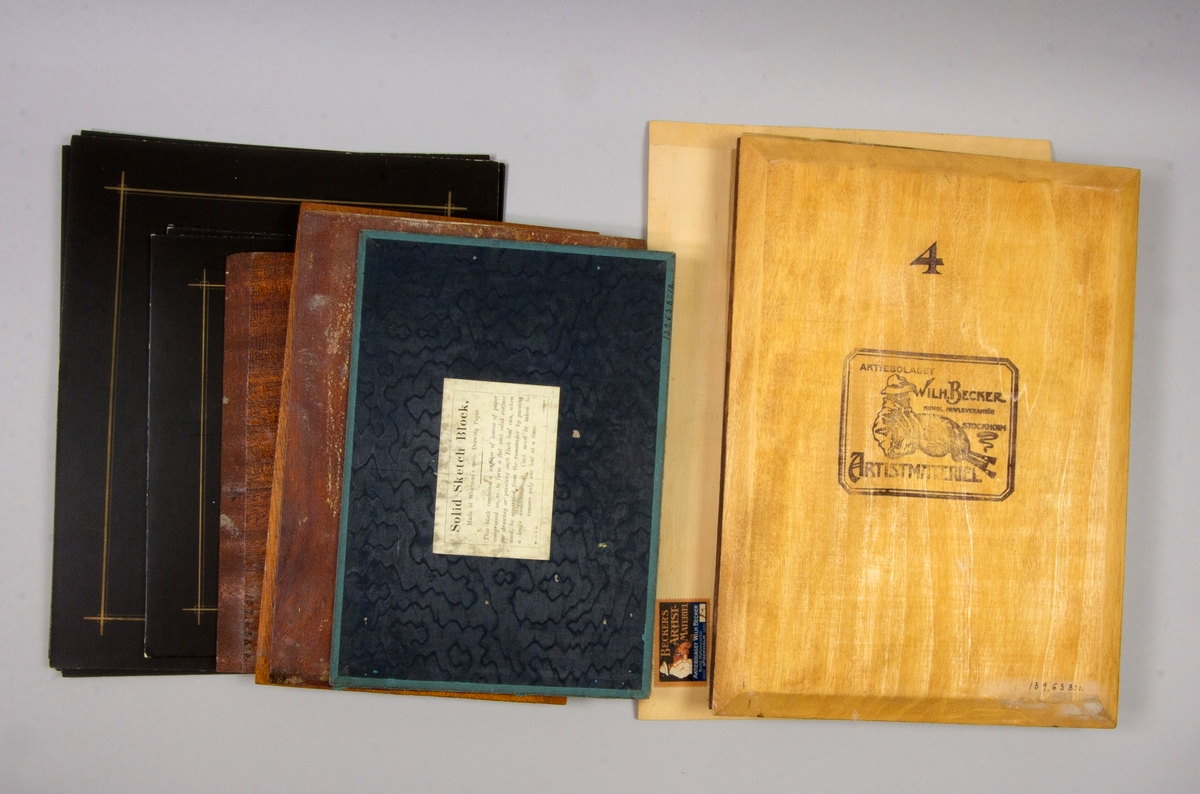
A selection of panels made from different sorts of wood or cardboard, from c. 1890-1920, belonging to Julius Kronberg

Wood was used as a support for a very long time: wooden statues were painted in the Old Kingdom of Egypt during the Fourth Dynasty (2600-2500 BC), by the time of the Dynasty VI the easel painting had started. Historically, many wood varieties were used:

- Beech, birch, larch, maple, and olive wood were used only occasionally, the first and third one in some German paintings, the last one in the Italian ones;
- Cedrus was extensively used in Ancient Egypt (cf. Fayum mummy portraits) and occasionally in Europe;
- Chestnut was frequently used for panels in Italy;
- Linden was used in German panel painting;
- Oak was extensively used in Europe, especially by the Flemish painters;
- Pine was extensively used for panels in Europe, although frequently other conifers are lumped under this name. In particular, fir used as a support is often confused with pine.
- Poplar was extensively used as a support, especially in Italy, Mona Lisa provides a famous example. The modern painters tend to use tulip poplar;
- Sycamore is notable for its use for Fayum mummy portraits.

=== Sheet glass ===
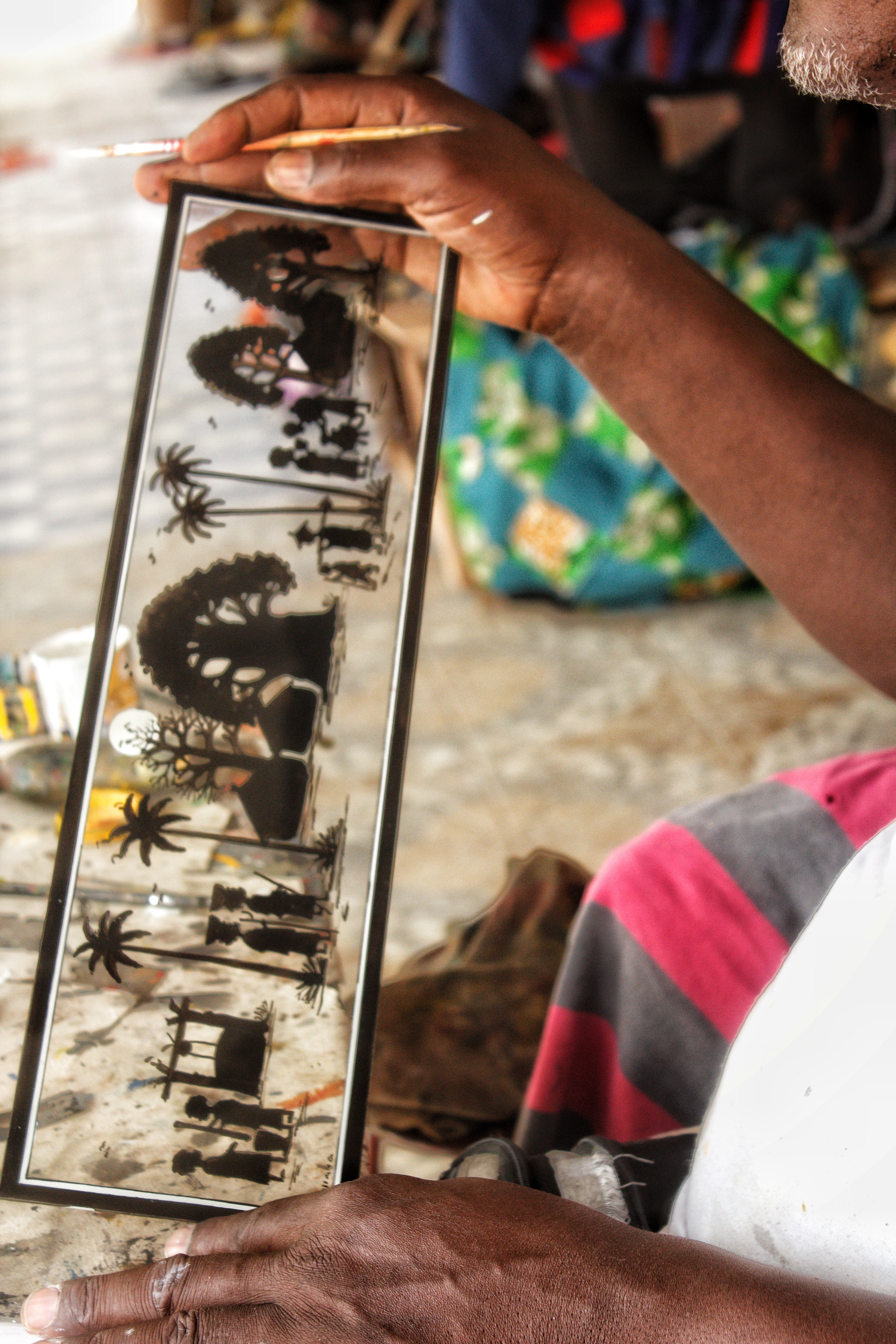
Illustration of daily life in the village on glass

In addition to the classic stained glass with its vitrification of the applied pigments, the paint can be applied to the glass as to any other support despite the smoothness of its surface. Da Vinci had suggested to make painting on the glass that are observed through the glass. This was supposed to reduce the diffusion of light from the paint surface, few experiments from later times have survived.

=== Metals ===
Due to the high cost of sheet metal prior to the end of the 18th century a mismatch between the flexibility of the metals and paint layers, and the ease with which metals can be bent or dented, the metallic materials were rarely used as supports. Copper use as a support started once it become inexpensive in sheet form around 16th century (the written record of use starts in the 17th century, along with other metals). Iron (sometimes with a tin coating) had seen very limited use, primarily for miniatures and coats of arms.

=== Ivory ===
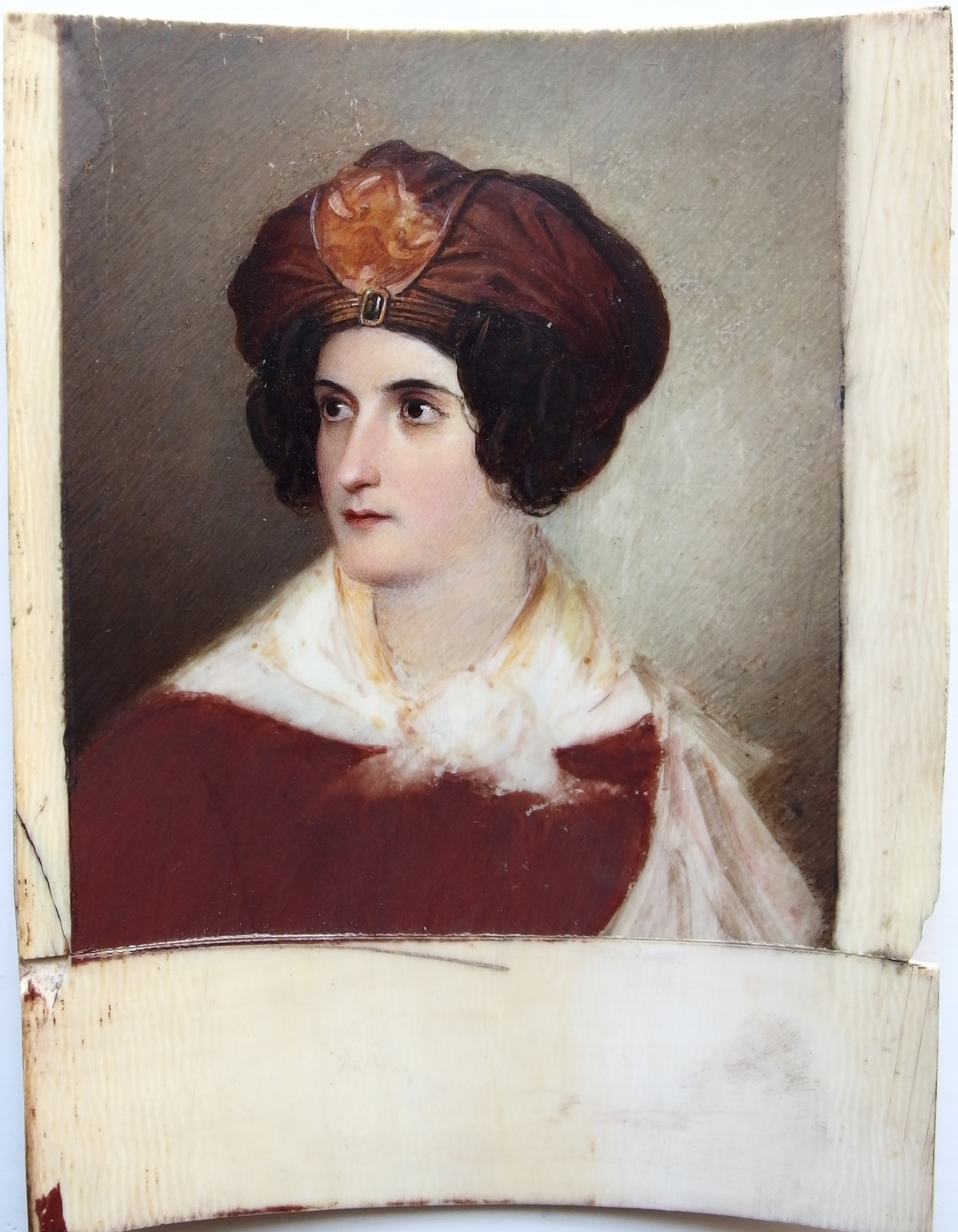
Miniature portrait on ivory by August Grahl. The stripy structure of ivory is visible in the unpainted areas.

Ivory for practical purposes includes, in addition to the elephant's tusks, the material from tusks of walruses and hippopotamuses. Ivory was commonly used for painting since Ancient Greece, but became rare in the medieval Europe. Thin slices of ivory came back as a support for miniatures in the 18th century due to the suitability for painting with transparent colors and ability to imitate the pale skin tones with intense red pigments applied to the back side of the slice.

=== Engineered wood ===
Artificial fiber boards have one advantage over wood as a support, besides the lower cost: they are homogenous and lack grain and are therefore unlikely to shrink or expand unidirectionally. Large panels need to be structurally reinforced to prevent them from buckling under their own weight. Masonite boards are of the particular interest to the painters, as they have a rough side (an imprint of a mesh used in the manufacturing process) with texture resembling a canvas. A gesso or other ground can be applied to the rough side, boards are hard and do not flex easily.

=== Paper ===
Paper in all its forms, since papyrus times (that dates as far back as 3rd millennium BC, times of First Dynasty of Egypt), was primarily used for writing, drawing and painting most likely went in parallel, notably in China and Japan. First mention of use as support for painting in medieval Europe is from 11th-12th centuries, regular use started around 1400 AD. Combinations of paper on wood or on cloth get into use in the 16th-century France

=== Plaster ===
Plaster coating for the walls was used as a support for the paintings since Paleolith and prehistoric times in Egypt, the selection of the plaster materials was varying by the location and date. Modern practice of murals follows the centuries-old traditions.

=== Leather ===
Leather was occasionally used for painting from the Antiquity to the 17th century. In particular, the use of parchment for paintings is mentioned by Pliny the Elder (1st century AD), became widespread for the illuminated manuscripts and lasted into the 17th century.

== Sources ==
- Osborne, Harold, ed. (1970b). "Ground". The Oxford Companion to Art. Oxford University Press. p. 517. ISBN 019866107X.
- Osborne, Harold, ed. (1970a). "Support". The Oxford Companion to Art. Oxford University Press. p. 1115. ISBN 019866107X.
- Friel, Michael (28 September 2010). "Supports". Still Life Painting Atelier: An Introduction to Oil Painting. Clarkson Potter/Ten Speed. pp. 46−48. ISBN 978-0-8230-3408-6. OCLC 1028481084.
- Pearce, Emma (16 December 2019). Artists' Materials: The Complete Source book of Methods and Media. Arcturus Publishing. ISBN 978-1-83940-466-5. OCLC 1151889240.
- Young, Christina; Katlan, Alexander W. (29 November 2020). "History of fabric supports". Conservation of Easel Paintings. Routledge. pp. 117–147. doi:10.4324/9780429399916-7. ISBN 978-0-429-39991-6.
- Gettens, R. J.; Stout, G. L. (1966). "Supports". Painting Materials: A Short Encyclopedia. Courier Corporation. pp. 220–276. ISBN 978-0-486-14242-5. OCLC 868969354.
- Stephenson, Jonathan (2003). "Support". Oxford Art Online. Oxford University Press. doi:10.1093/gao/9781884446054.article.t082371. ISBN 978-1-884446-05-4.
