= Anastasiya Markovich =

Ukrainian artist (born 1979)

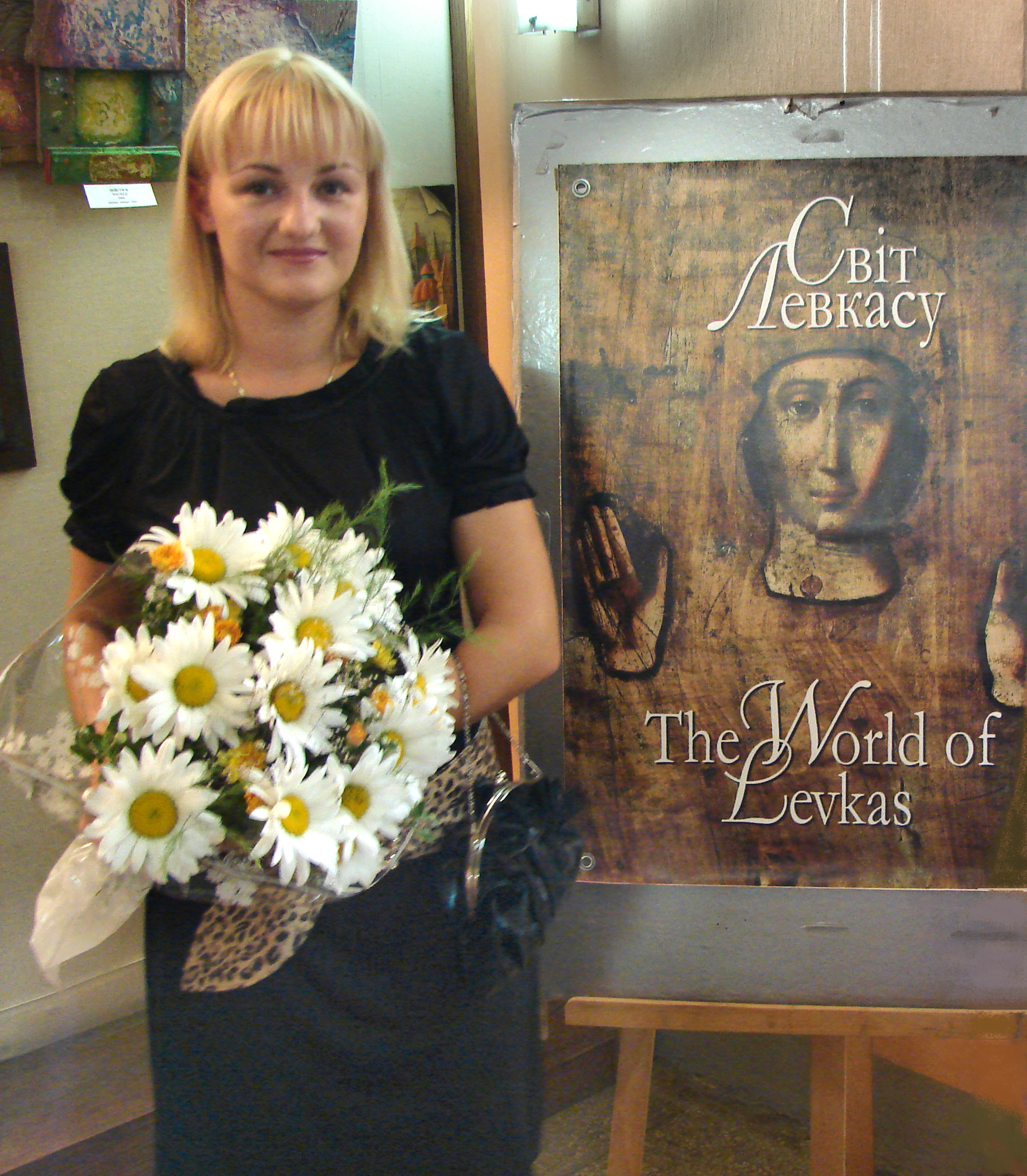
- Anastasiya Markovich, Introduction from the art book Світ Левкасу or "The World of Levkas, on 6 September 2008
- Born: Anastasiya Markovich; 23 October 1979; Brichany, Moldavian SSR, Soviet Union
- Education: Chernivtsi Art School
- Known for: Painting

Anastasia Markovich (born October 23, 1979, Brichany, Moldavian SSR) is a Ukrainian painter. Anastasiya Markovich lives and works in Chernivtsi in the south-west of Ukraine where she grew up. Markovich is known for several exhibitions in and outside of Ukraine and publications in several art magazines and the art book “Світ Левкасу” (“The World of Levkas”).

== Biography ==
Anastasiya Markovich is the older of two children of Viktor Markovich and Irena Markovich (née Moskvina). She has a brother Yuri Markovich.

The entire family is active in the visual arts. Her father Viktor Markovich is a painter, her mother Irena Markovich is making designs and her brother Yuri Markovich is also a painter.

In 1985, Markovich entered the lyceum in Chernivtsi from where she graduated in 1996. From 1990, she also studied at the Chernivtsi Art School, from where she graduated in 1994. Markovich took part in a number of children and youth exhibitions and won some competitions. In 1996 Anastasiya Markovich entered the Chernivtsi Academy of Law and Economics, specializing on criminal law, civil law and trade law.

To further her artistic prowess, she went for further additional studies to studios of other painters, like Dariusz Milinski and Tomasz Sętowski in Poland and was making study tours to Poland, Germany, The Netherlands, Belgium and France.

== Cultural influences ==
Markovich has always expressed the cultural influence of her home town Chernivtsi, which is famous for artists who lived and worked in this town and created works of literature, poetry, architecture and visual arts. Also many musicians, dance groups and actors started their artistical live in Chernivtsi. In these surroundings of famous artists and cultural history, Markovich created her paintings and developed her ideas and style.

== Literature and accolades ==
- Article in Newsweek (polish edition), 3/2004 18–01–04, by Magdalena Łukaszewicz
- Article in the Ukrainian magazine: Версії, nr 45 11-11/18-11 2005 Title: "Багата Настя на таланти та щедрість", "A lot of talent by Nastia (Anastasiya Markovich)", by G. Sheredarik.
- The book: “Світ Левкасу” or “The World of Levkas”. Printed in 2007, and edited by Mykola Storozhenko. Publication: Ministry of Culture and Tourism of Ukraine and Academy of Arts of Ukraine. (ISBN 978-966-2147-09-4, ISBN 978-966-21-4712-4 and ISBN 978-966-21-4734-6)
- 2008, Certificate from Mr. Chebykin A. V. President of Ukrainian Academy of Arts of Ukraine.
- Article in Ukrainian magazine: Версії, nr 51(258) 19-12/26-12 2008 Title: "Талановиті Марковичі", "Talent by the Markovichs", by Ludmila Cheredarik.

== Examples of her work ==
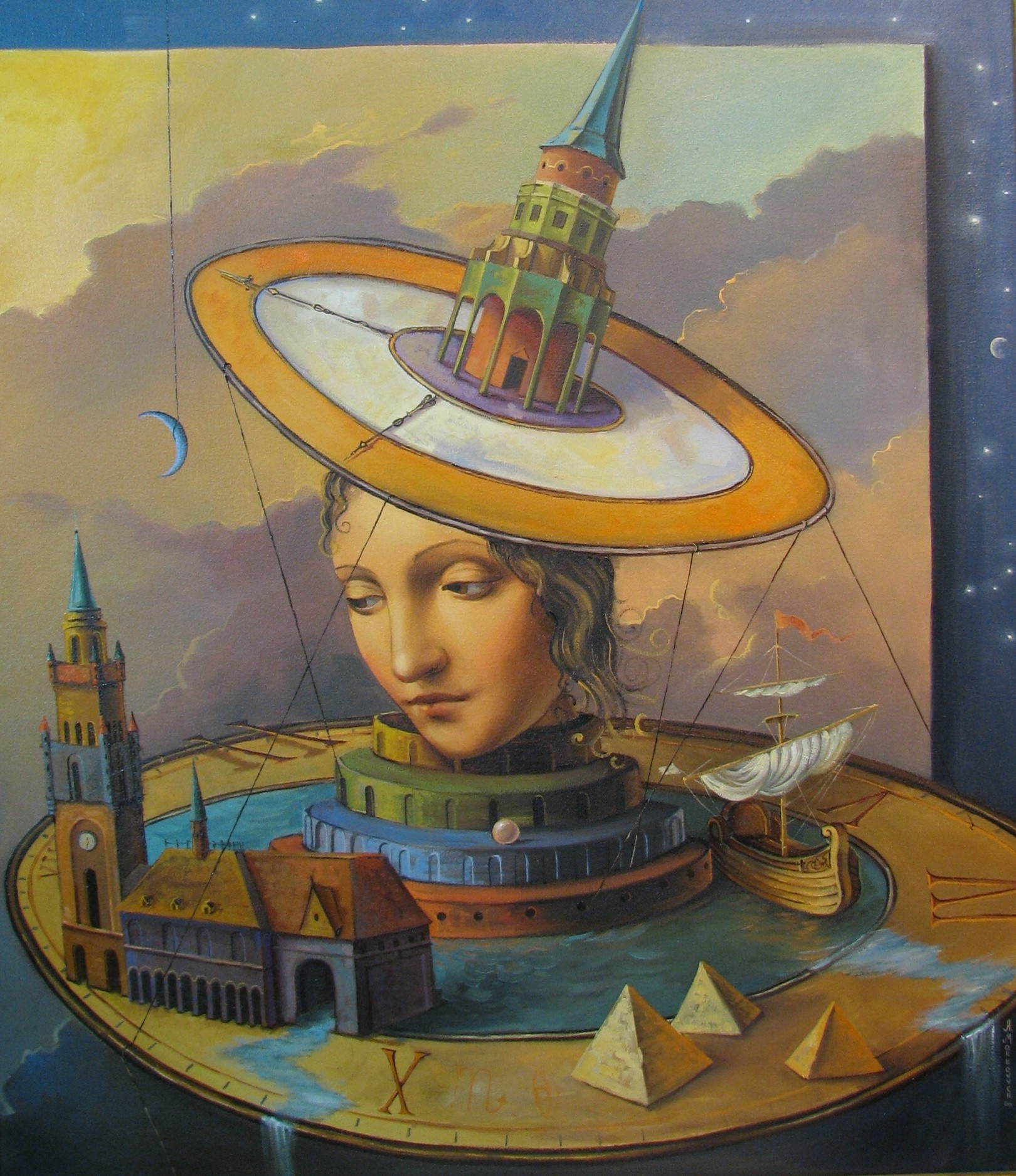
The Past. Painting in oil on linen, 2006. 70x60cm.

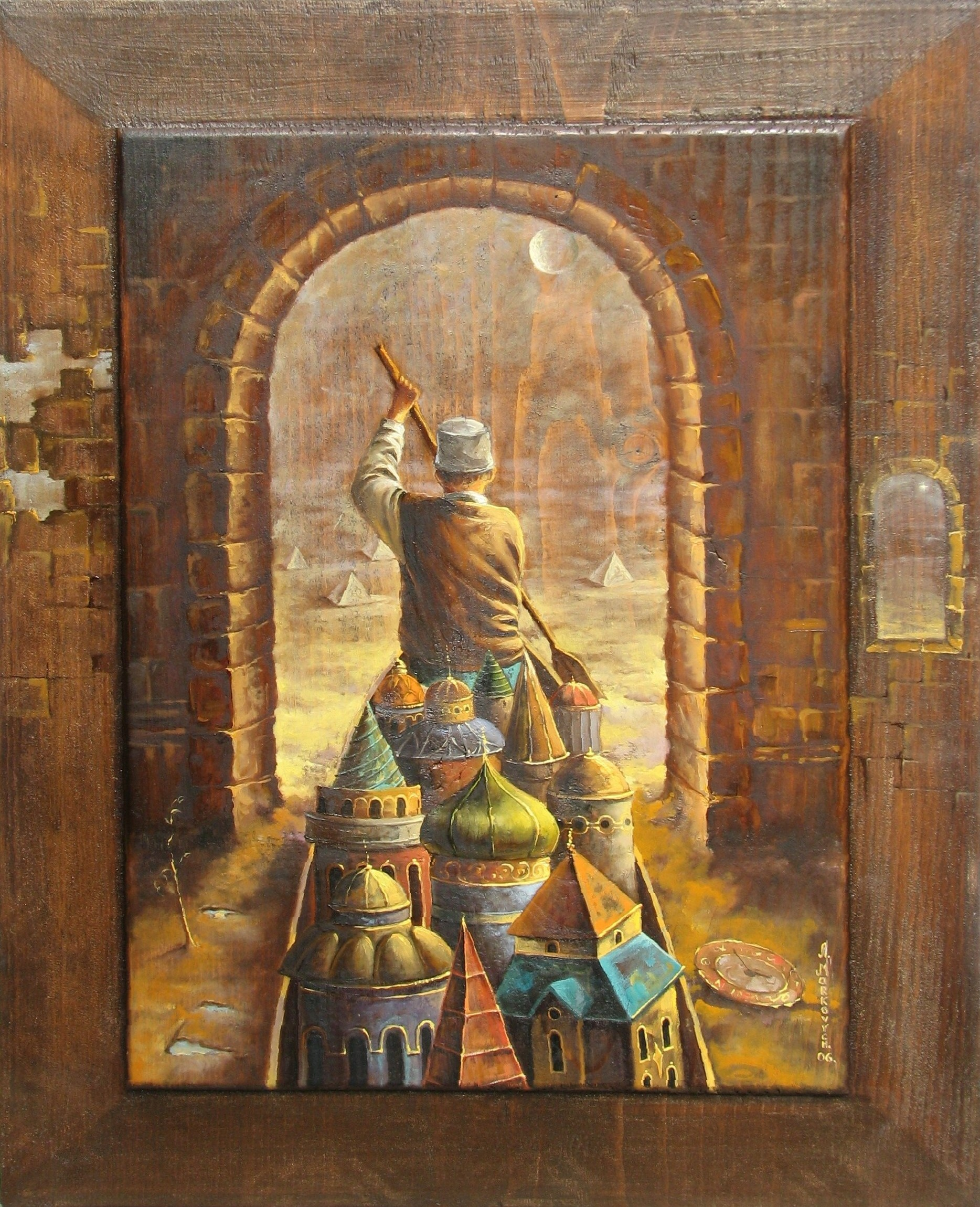
Traveller. Painting in oil on a panel from wood, 2006. 40x30cm.

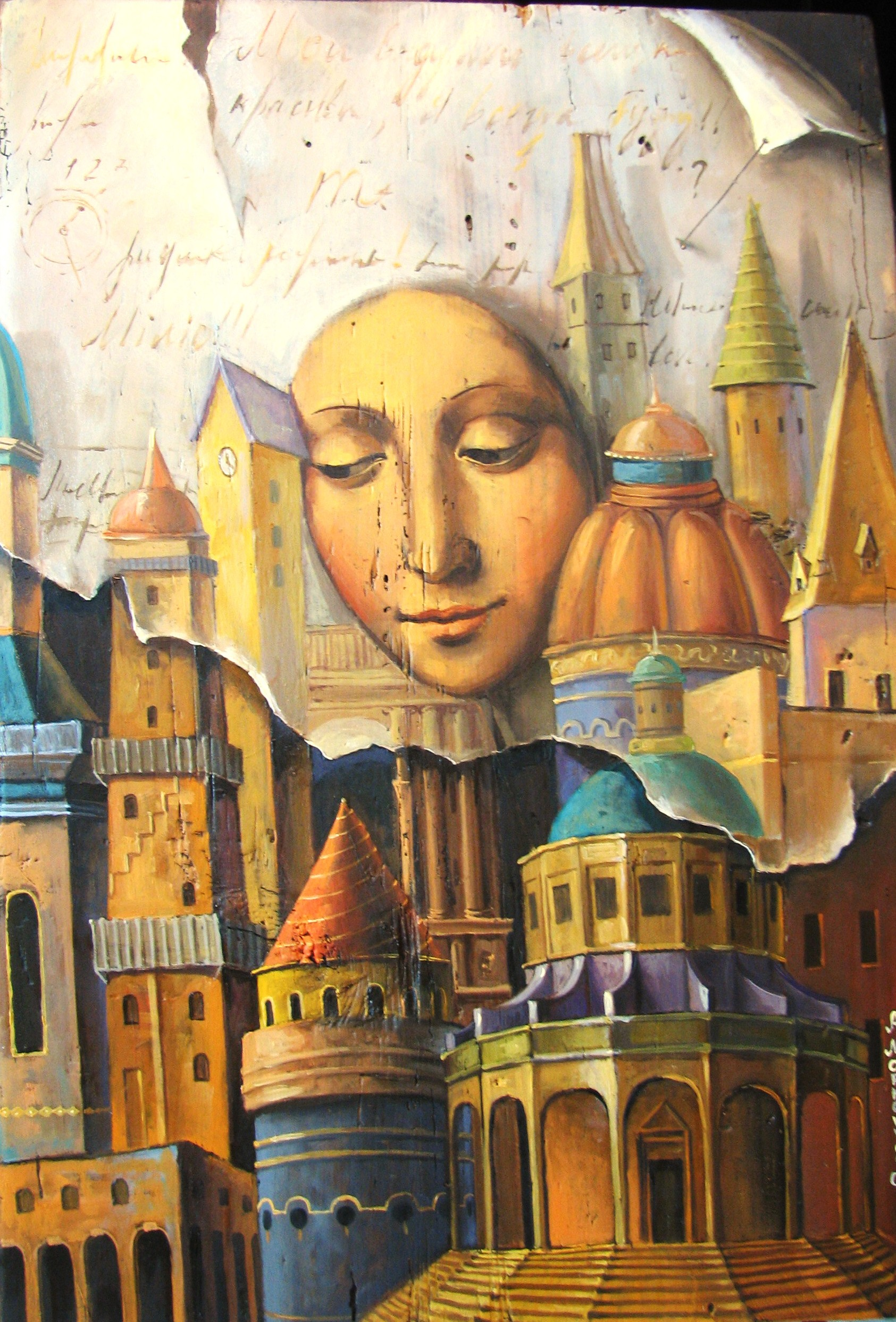
Through the Centuries. Painting in oil on a panel from wood, 2006. 32x22cm.

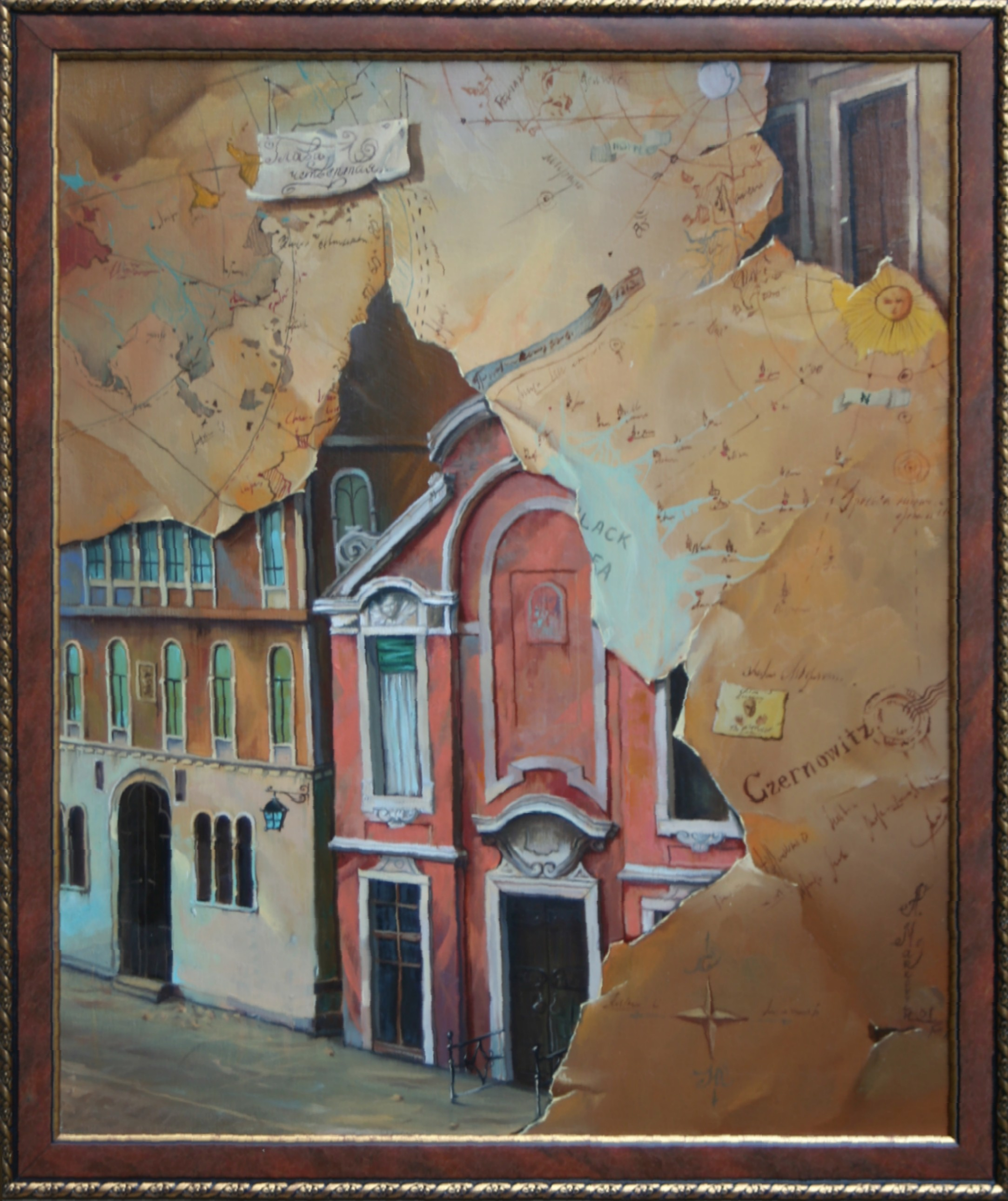
Day of the Town. Painting in oil on linen, 2008. 60x50cm.

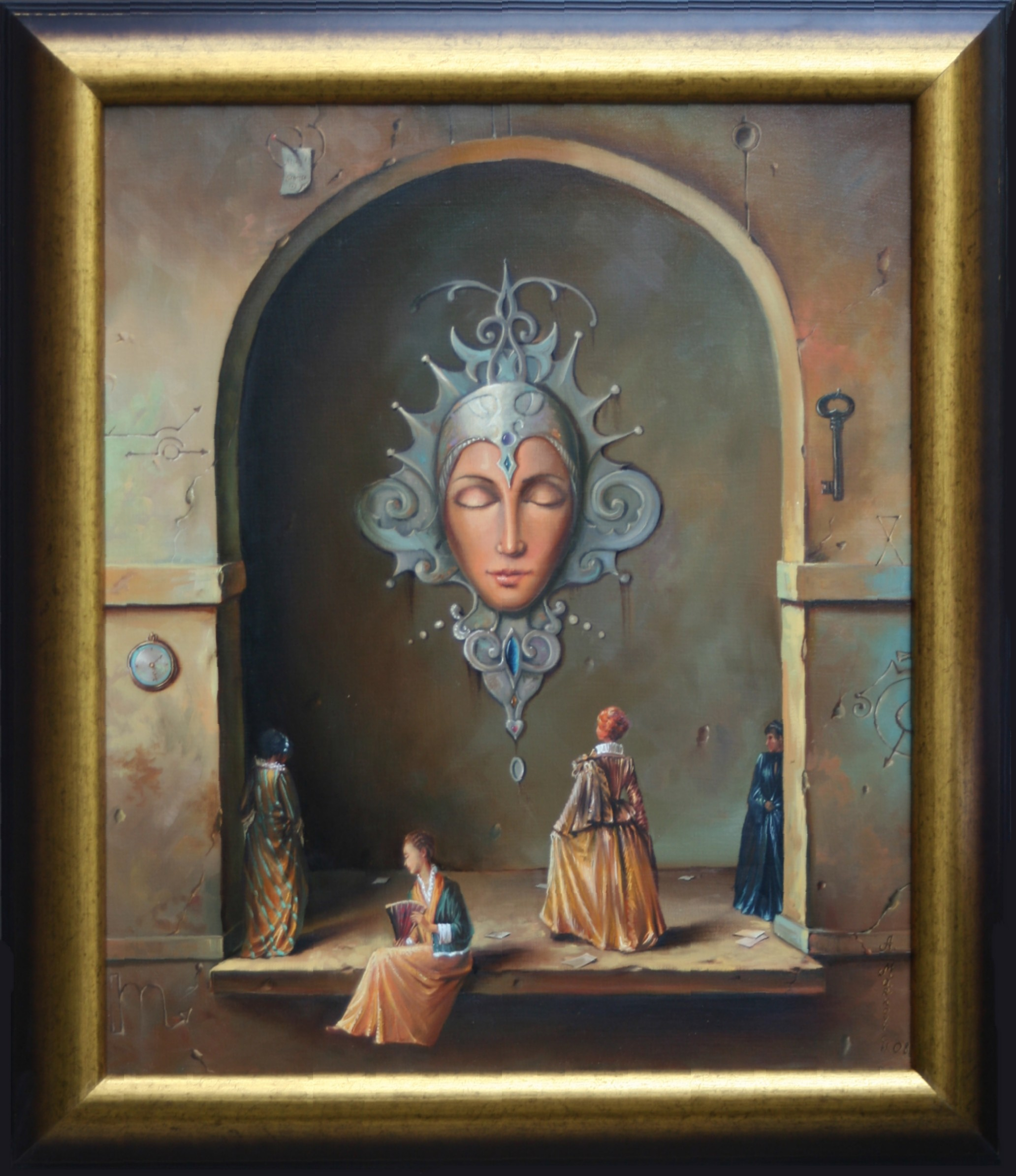
Mask. Painting in oil on linen, 2008. 60x50cm.

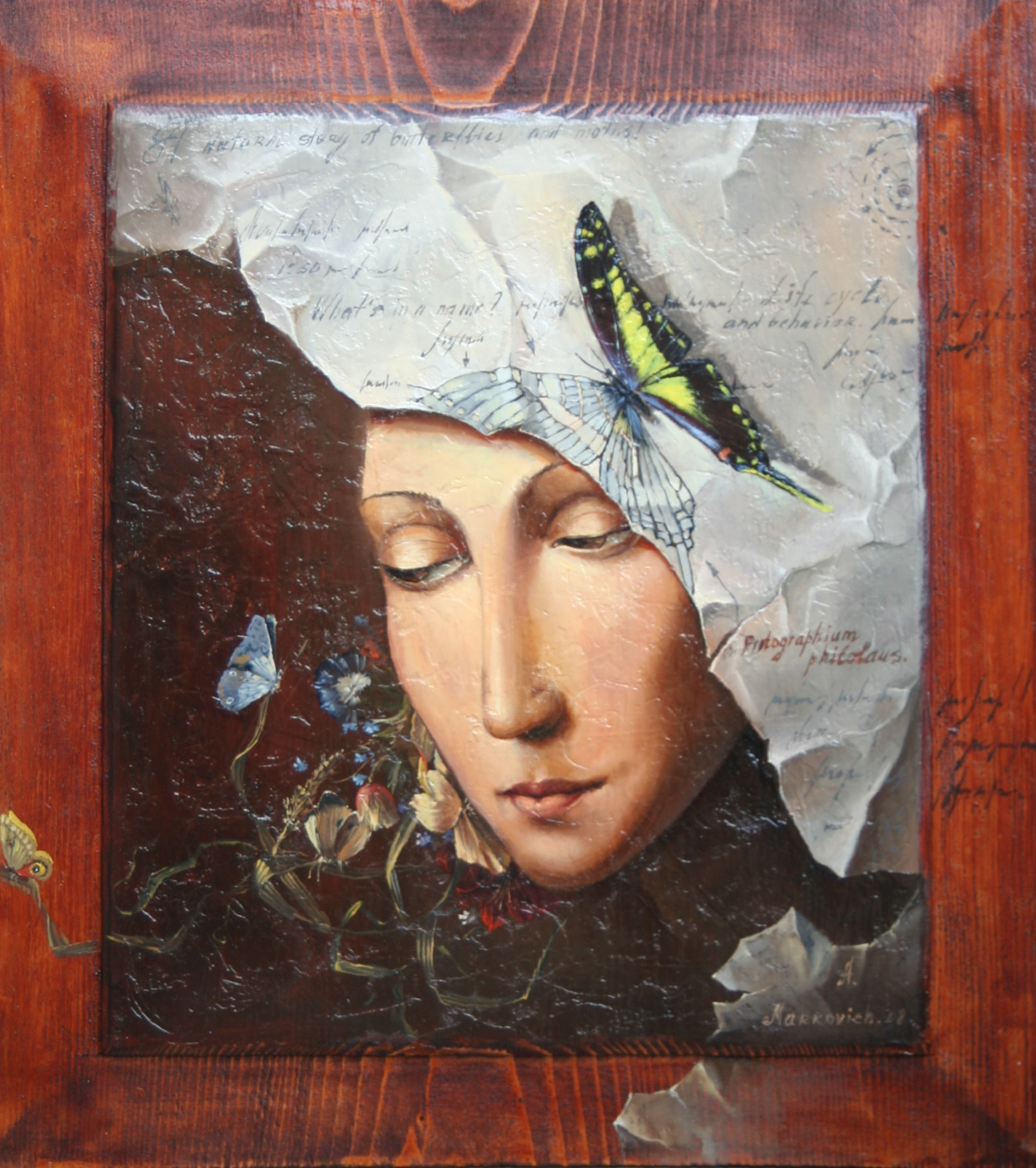
Illusion of Reality. Painting in oil on a panel from wood, 2008. 50x44,5 cm.
