= Ground (art) =

Prepared surface for a painting

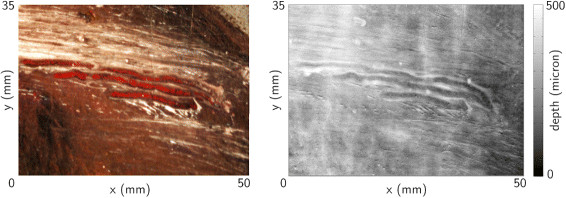
A detail of a self-portrait by Rembrandt. Three scratches in the center reveal the reddish ground

In visual arts, the ground (sometimes called a primer) is a prepared surface that covers the support of the picture (e.g., a canvas or a panel) and underlies the actual painting (the colors are overlaid onto the ground). Occasionally the term is also used in a broad sense to designate any surface used for painting, for example, paper for watercolor or plaster for fresco.

The main purposes of the ground are to block chemical interactions between the paint and the support and to provide desired texture for painting or drawing.

The ground is also used to highlight the colors, and its color and tone affect the appearance of paint levels above, therefore the painters might have individual preferences for the color of the ground: 19th century artists, especially the impressionists, preferred the white ground (first used by J. M. W. Turner), while Rembrandt preferred brownish tones and Poussin the red ones. The oil painting becomes more transparent with age, so to avoid a gradual brightening of the picture, a pale beige color of ground is considered neutral. White ground provides the greatest freedom of choice for colors, while colored grounds reduce the color range and force the use of more opaque paint application.

For paintings on panels, gesso is typically used as a ground; on canvas the ground can be yet another (inert) paint layer. Two layers are occasionally applied, forming a double ground. On canvas, the ground is typically applied after sizing (typically rabbit-skin glue). Although it is possible to paint on the sized canvas directly, without any ground at all, size is not a replacement for ground, as it is not intended to form a level surface for painting, its purpose is to simply fill pores and isolate the canvas from the overlaying paint.

Oxford Companion to Art lists the following requirements for the good ground:

- durability and resistance to flaking off or cracking;
- consistency and even tone across the surface;
- not being too smooth, so it can hold the pigments;
- not being too rough, so it does not impede the painting process;
- luminosity and reflectivity are needed for painting with most pigments, except the very opaque ones;
- low absorbance;
- the ground must be lean.

== History ==
A mixture of gesso (or chalk in the northern countries) and glue was used to prime the panels, the technique was known from Antiquity (described by Theophilus Presbyter). Heraclius Presbyter describes a more flexible ground for canvas made from a thin layer of gesso atop sugar and starch glue. Adding soap and honey to make gesso more liquid was brought into Italy from Byzantine; a thin elastic ground that allowed the painting to be rolled was developed in Venice.

Coloring the grounds is also a very long tradition. In 2nd century Galen describes a use of glaze to reduce the brightness of the gesso. In the Medieval and early Renaissance time thin coats of paint (imprimatura) were used for the same purpose:

- unfinished Michelangelo works suggest that he used green underpaint for flesh tints;
- Da Vinci suggests using the white ground for transparent colors, so the typical ground must have been colored;
- Venetians' grounds were of darker colors;
- Titian used brown or brownish red;
- Florentines preferred light tones, gray in the Vasari period;
- Rubens employed either ground charcoal with white over gypsum base or solid gray tints.

By the 17th century an oil ground with added litharge atop vegetable glue was used, although combinations of gypsum and glue were preferred. Many painters started using red or brown pigments for their oil grounds.

In Jackson Pollock's 1950 painting, Mural on Indian Red Ground, the red, colored ground layer is visible throughout the painting, providing thematic consistency for the main color layer of drips and splashes.

== Types ==
Pearce lists the following types of grounds:

- alkyd ground is made of "oil-modified alkyd resin" (oil is added to improve drying) and are in use since the 1960s. Titanium white is used for color;
- oil ground was a lean lead-based primer, no longer used due to being a health hazard, modern "oil ground" is actually alkyd;
- genuine gesso ground is a lean ground typically used on top of the boards;
- half-chalk ground;
- acrylic ground is made of acrylic resin with titanium white pigment (a "clear gesso" is actually an acrylic without the pigment).

== Specialized grounds ==
The surface preparation for murals is very fragmented and depends on the local climatic conditions, painting technique (fresco, secco, encaustic), and the artistic effect to be achieved (illusionism vs. decoration).

For metalpoint drawings the surface needs to be abrasive, so a ground of Chinese white is used.

Engravers sometimes utilize an acid-resistant mixture as a starting layer.

Traditional encaustic painting utilizes a special ground of beeswax or a wax and damar resin mix over an absorbent substrate.

Commercially primed surfaces include canvas, wood panels, hardboard, and other support structures primed with different coatings. An example of a painting done on commercially-prepared canvas is Willem de Kooning's 1955 abstract expressionist oil painting, Woman-Ochre. In "Layer by Layer: Studying Woman-Ochre," the J. Paul Getty Museum describes the painting surface, noting that an unprimed selvedge on the canvas "is a clue that this canvas was prepared in a factory and sold ready for painting." The article mentions both the physical and aesthetic or visual properties of the ground: "De Kooning left the ground and preparation layers of the canvas—which are composed of chalk, zinc white, and lead white—visible throughout the background behind the figure."

== See also ==
- White ground technique
- Gold ground

== Sources ==
- Osborne, Harold, ed. (1970). "Ground". The Oxford Companion to Art. Oxford University Press. p. 517. ISBN 019866107X.
- "Ground". nationalgallery.org.uk. The National Gallery.
- Pearce, Emma (16 December 2019). Artists' Materials: The Complete Source book of Methods and Media. Arcturus Publishing. ISBN 978-1-83940-466-5. OCLC 1151889240.
- Ormsby, Bronwyn; Gottsegen, Mark (29 November 2020). "Grounds, 1400–1900". Conservation of Easel Paintings. Routledge. pp. 163–191. doi:10.4324/9780429399916-9. ISBN 9780429399916. S2CID 228825147.
- Gettens, R. J.; Stout, G. L. (1966). "Ground". Painting Materials: A Short Encyclopedia. Courier Corporation. p. 329. ISBN 978-0-486-14242-5. OCLC 868969354.
- Mayer, Ralph (September 1970). The Artist's Handbook of Materials and Techniques (3rd ed.). New York: Viking Books. ISBN 9780670136650.
