= Surface chemistry of paper =

The surface chemistry of paper is responsible for many important paper properties, such as gloss, waterproofing, and printability. Many components are used in the paper-making process that affect the surface.

== Pigment and dispersion medium ==
Coating components are subject to particle-particle, particle-solvent, and particle-polymer interactions. Van der Waals forces, electrostatic repulsions, and steric stabilization are the reasons for these interactions. Importantly, the characteristics of adhesion and cohesion between the components form the base coating structure. Calcium carbonate and kaolin are commonly used pigments. Pigments support a structure of fine porosity and form a light scattering surface. The surface charge of the pigment plays an important role in dispersion consistency. The surface charge of calcium carbonate is negative and not dependent on pH, however it can decompose under acidic conditions. Kaolin has negatively charged faces while the charge of its laterals depend on pH, being positive in acidic conditions and negative in basic conditions with an isoelectric point at 7.5. The equation for determining the isoelectric point is as follows:

$$pI = {{pKa} + {pKb} \over 2}$$

In the papermaking process, the pigment dispersions are generally kept at a pH above 8.0.

== Pigments, binders, and co-binders ==
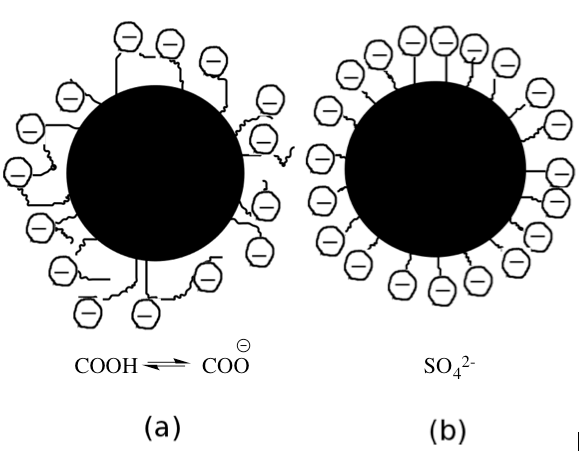
Binder spheres coated with acrylic acid (a) and anionic surfactant (b).

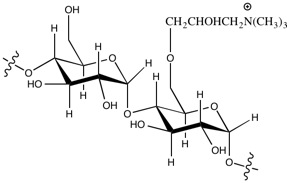
The molecular structure of cationic starch. The repeating unit of starch is derived from glucose interconnected with glycosidic bonds.

Binders promote the binding of pigment particles between themselves and the coating layer of the paper. Binders are spherical particles less than 1 µm in diameterr. Common binders are styrene maleic anhydride copolymer or styrene-acrylate copolymer. The surface chemical composition is differentiated by the adsorption of acrylic acid or an anionic surfactant, both of which are used for stabilization of the dispersion in water. Co-binders, or thickeners, are generally water-soluble polymers that influence the paper's color viscosity, water retention, sizing, and gloss. Some common examples are carboxymethyl cellulose (CMC), cationic and anionic hydroxyethyl cellulose (EHEC), modified starch, and dextrin.

== Sizing ==
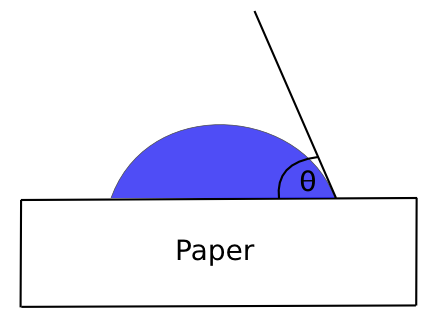
The contact angle is the angle between a droplet of liquid and a paper surface.

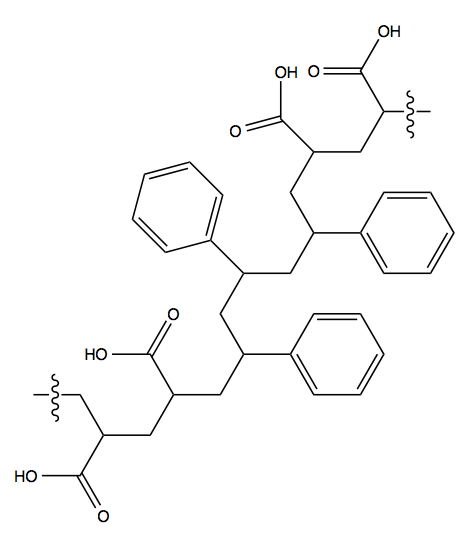
The molecular structure of co-styrene acrylate

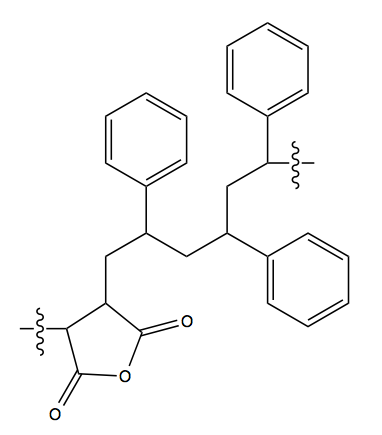
The molecular structure of co-styrene-maleic anhydride

In sizing, the strength and printability of paper is increased. Sizing also improves the hydrophilic character, liquid spreading, and affinity for ink. Starch is the most common sizing agent. Cationic starch and hydrophilic agents are also applied, including alkenyl succinic anhydride (ASA) and alkyl ketene dimers (AKD).

Cationic starch increases strength because it binds to the anionic paper fibers. The amount added is usually between ten and thirty pounds per ton. When starch exceeds the amount the fibers can bind to, it causes foaming in the production process as well as decreased retention and drainage.

== Surface modification ==
=== Plasma surface modification ===
Surface modification makes paper hydrophobic and oleophilic. This combination allows ink oil to penetrate the paper, but prevents dampening water absorption, which increases papers printability.

Three different plasma-solid interactions are used: etching/ablation, plasma activation, and plasma coating. Etching or ablation is when material is removed from the surface of the solid. Plasma activation is where species in the plasma like ions, electrons, or radicals are used to chemically or physically modify the surface. Lastly, plasma coating is where material is coated to the surface in the form of a thin film. Plasma coating can be used to add hydrocarbons to surfaces which can make a surface non-polar or hydrophobic. The specific type of plasma coating used to add hydrocarbons is called plasma enhanced chemical vapor deposition process or PCVD.

=== Contact angle ===
An ideal hydrophobic surface would have a contact angle of 180 degrees to water. This means that the hydrocarbons lie flat against the surface creating a thin layer and preventing dampening water absorption. However, in practice it is fine or even preferred to have a low level of dampening water absorption because of a phenomenon that occurs when water settles at the surface of paper. This phenomenon is when ink is unable to transfer to the paper because of the water layer at the surface. The contact angle value for hydrocarbons on a rough pigment-coated paper can be found to be approximately 110° through a contact angle meter.

The Young's equation can be used to calculate the surface energy of a liquid on paper. Young's equation is:

$$\gamma_{\mathrm{SL}}+\gamma_{\mathrm{LG}}\cos{\theta_\mathrm{c}}=\gamma_{\mathrm{SG}}\,$$

where $\gamma_{\mathrm{SL}}$ is the interfacial tension between the solid and the liquid, $\gamma_{\mathrm{LG}}$ is the interfacial tension between the liquid and the vapor, and $\gamma_{\mathrm{SG}}$ is the interfacial tension between the solid and the vapor.

An ideal oleophilic surface would have a contact angle of 0° with oil, therefore allowing the ink to transfer to the paper and be absorbed. The hydrocarbon plasma coating provides an oleophilic surface to the paper by lowering the contact angle of the paper with the oil in the ink. The hydrocarbon plasma coating increases the non-polar interactions while decreasing polar interactions which allow paper to absorb ink while preventing dampening water absorption.

== Applications ==
Printing quality is highly influenced by the various treatments and methods used in creating paper and enhancing the paper surface. Consumers are most concerned with the paper-ink interactions which vary for certain types of paper due to different chemical properties of the surface. Inkjet paper is the most commercially used type of paper. Filter paper is another key type of paper whose surface chemistry affects its various forms and uses. The ability of adhesives to bond to a paper surface is also affected by the surface chemistry.

=== Inkjet printing paper ===
Co-styrene-maleic anhydride and co-styrene acrylate are common binders associated with a cationic starch pigment in Inkjet printing paper. Table 1 shows their surface tension under given conditions.

Compound	Monomer Proportion	pH	Surface Tension (mN/m)
Cationic Starch	-	5.0	32.9
Co-styrene-maleic anhydride	3:1	7.6	38.51
Co-styrene acrylate	3:4	4.3	49.99

There have been several studies that have focused on how the paper printing quality is dependent on the concentration of these binders and ink pigment. Data from the experiments are congruent and stated in Table 2 as the corrected contact angle of water, the corrected contact angle of black ink, and the total surface energy.

Sample	Sizing Formulation (% w/w)	Contact Angle of Water (˚)	Contact Angle of Black Ink (˚)	Total Surface Energy (mN/m)
1	no surface treatment	103.1	81.7	39.5
2	100% cationic starch	39.2	36.1	51.25
3	80% cationic starch/ 20% co-styrene-maleic anhydride	80.5	65.2	38.39
4	80% cationic starch/ 20% co-styrene acrylate	60.2	60.5	42.39

The contact angle measurement has proven to be a very useful tool to evaluate the influence of the sizing formulation on the printing properties. Surface free energy has also shown to be very valuable in explaining the differences in sample behavior.

=== Filter paper ===
Various composite coatings were analyzed on filter paper in an experiment done by Wang et al. The ability to separate homogenous liquid solutions based on varying surface tensions has great practical use. Creating superhydrophobic and superoleophilic filter paper was achieved by treating the surface of commercially available filter paper with hydrophobic silica nanoparticles and polystyrene solution in toluene. Oil and water were successfully separated through the use of the filter paper created with an efficiency greater than 96%. In a homogenous solution the filter paper was also successful in separating the liquids through differentiating for surface tensions. Although with a lower efficiency, aqueous ethanol was also extracted from the solution when tested on the filter paper.

== See also ==
- Paper chemicals
- Papermaking
- Sizing
