= Gesso =

Paint primer composed of a white pigment and a binder

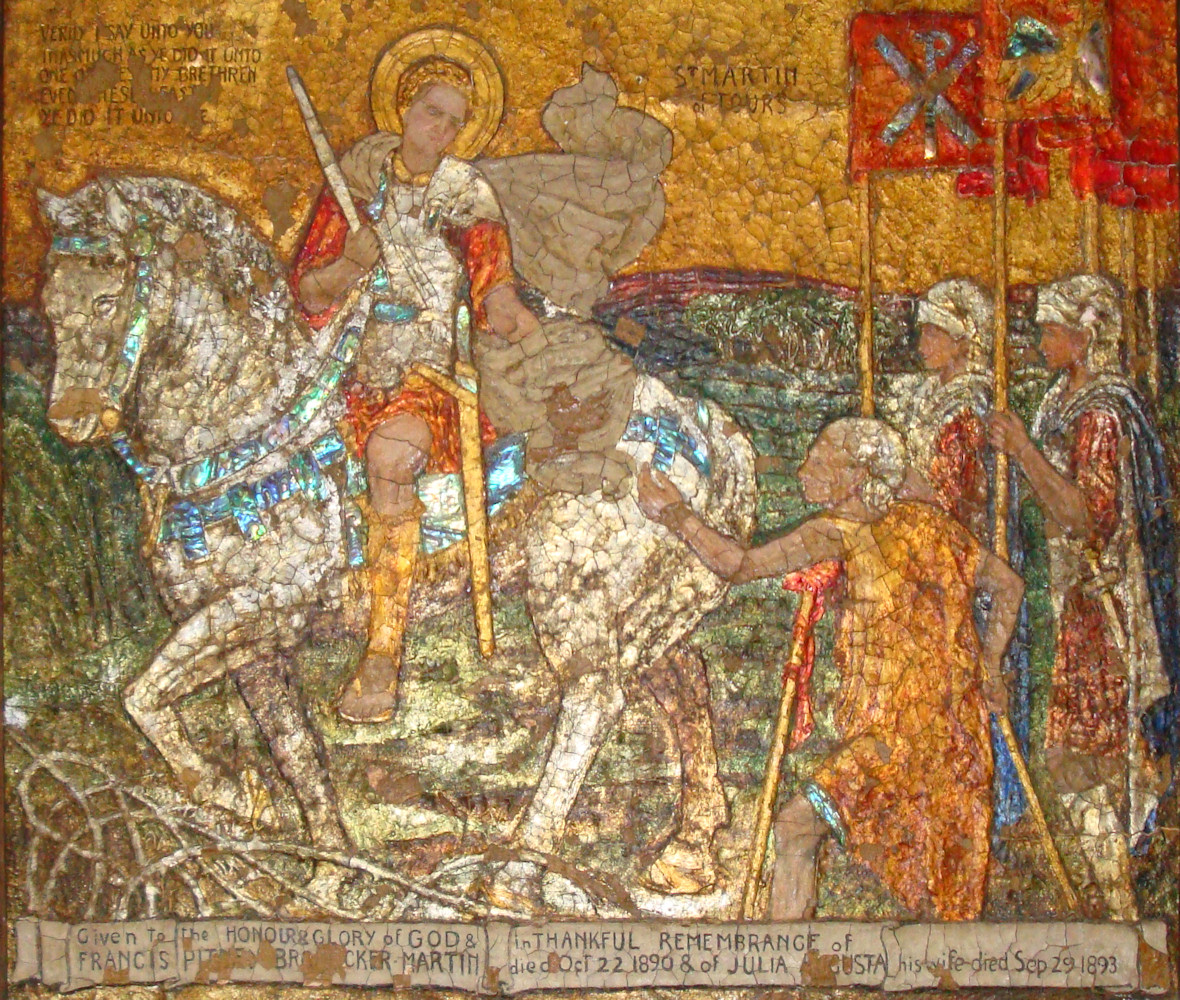
A restored gesso panel representing St. Martin of Tours, from St. Michael and All Angels Church, Lyndhurst, Hampshire

Gesso (Italian pronunciation: [ˈdʒɛsso]; 'chalk', from the Latin: gypsum, from Greek: γύψος), also known as "glue gesso" or "Italian gesso", is a white paint mixture used to coat rigid surfaces such as wooden painting panels or masonite as a permanent absorbent primer substrate for painting. It consists of a binder mixed with chalk, gypsum, pigment, or any combination of these.

Gesso is used in painting as a preparation for any number of substrates such as wood panels, canvas and sculpture as a base for paint and other materials that are applied over it.

== Characteristics ==
The colour of gesso is usually white or off-white. Its absorbency makes it work with all painting media, including water-based media, different types of tempera and oil paint.

Mixing and applying it is a craft in itself, as it is usually applied in ten or more extremely thin layers. The hide glue mixture used to make the traditional gesso is rather brittle and susceptible to cracking, thus making it suitable for rigid surfaces only.

When painting, there are several advantages to using gesso. It provides a strong foundation for the paint to adhere to, prevents the paint from soaking into the surface, and can also be used to achieve a desired texture or surface finish. Furthermore, gesso can help to extend the life of a painting by acting as a barrier to protect it from moisture, dust, and ultraviolet (UV) light.

== Composition ==
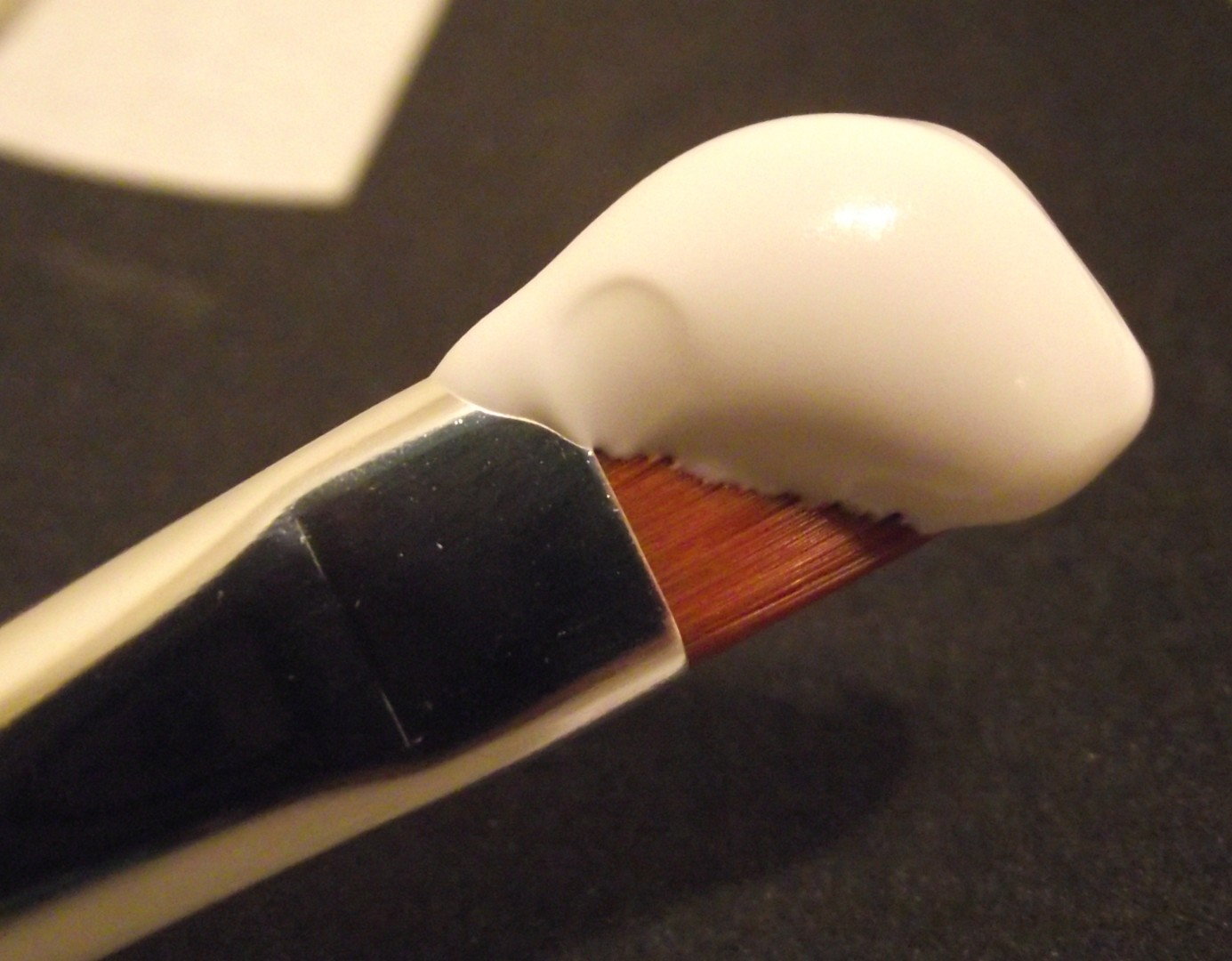
Acrylic gesso

Gesso is traditionally a mix of an animal glue binder (usually rabbit-skin glue), chalk, and white pigment.

For priming flexible canvas, an emulsion of gesso and linseed oil, also called "half-chalk ground", is used.

Acrylic gesso is a mixture of white pigment and some kind of filler (chalk, silica, etc.) and acrylic resin dispersed in water. It produces a soft, flexible non-absorbent surface that is technically not gesso (although it is commonly called that by its manufacturers). It can contain calcium carbonate (CaCO_{3}) to increase the absorbency of the primer coat as well as titanium dioxide or "titanium white" as a whitening agent. It is sold premixed for both sizing and priming panels and flexible canvas for painting. Art supply manufacturers market canvases pre-primed with acrylic gesso. Acrylic gesso can be colored, either commercially by replacing the titanium white with another pigment, such as carbon black, or by the artist directly, with the addition of an acrylic paint. Acrylic gesso can be odorous, due to the presence of ammonia or formaldehyde, which are added in small amounts as preservatives. Acrylic gesso's non-absorbent acrylic polymer base makes it incompatible with media that require an absorbent substrate, such as egg tempera. The Painter's Handbook notes a problem with using oil paints over an acrylic gesso ground instead of a traditional oil ground, citing a mismatch in flexibility that over time could cause the oil paint to delaminate.

== Uses ==
Sculptors may use gesso to prepare the shape of a final sculpture (fused bronze) or directly as a material for sculpting. Gesso can also be used as a layer between sculpted wood and gold leaf. In this case, a layer of refined and coloured clay called bole is used to cover the gesso before applying the gold. Bole is usually red in colour.

Gesso can also serve as a base on three-dimensional surfaces for the application of paint or gold leaf.
