= Rabbit-skin glue =

Animal glue sizing and adhesive

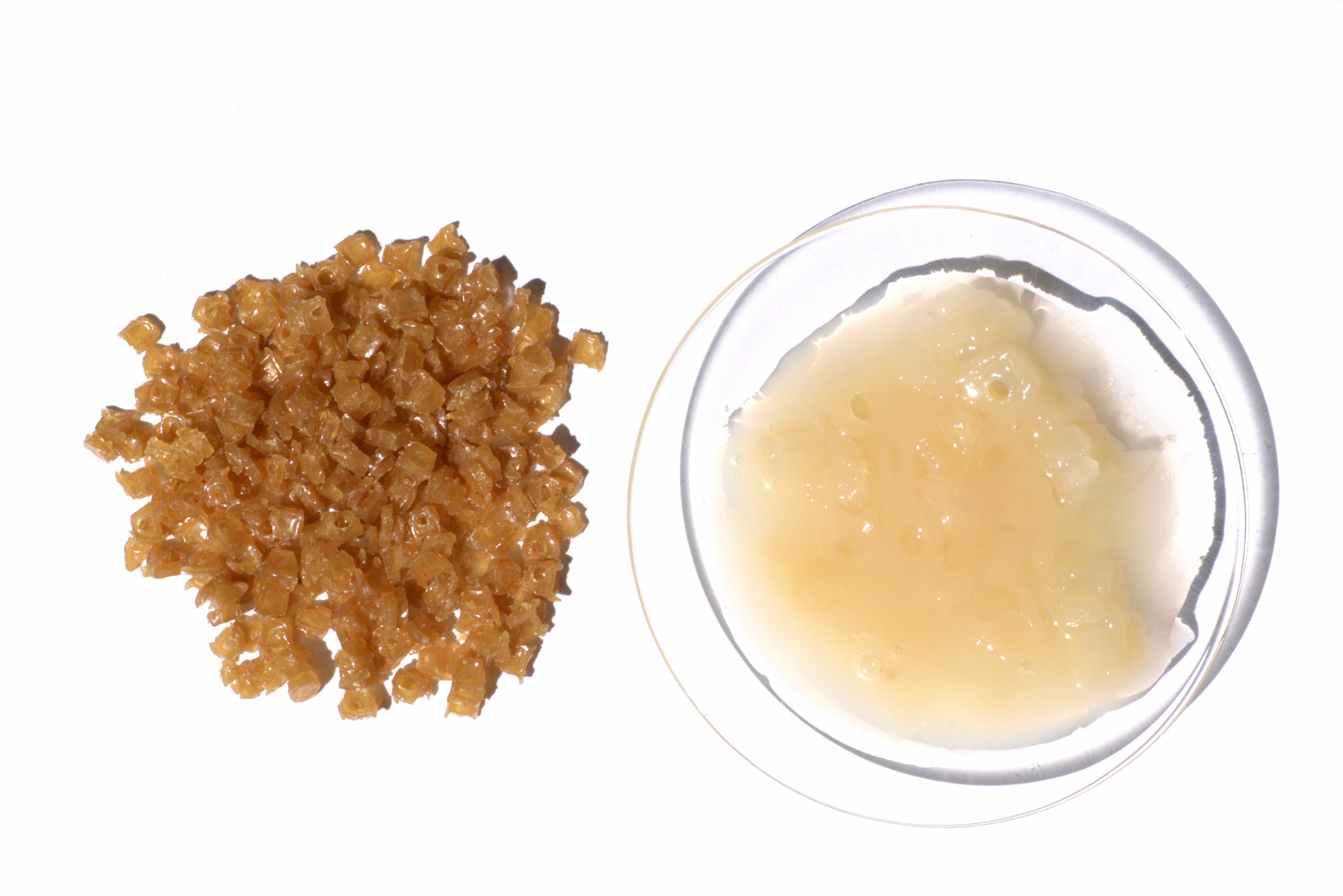
Rabbit-skin glue, in pellet form (left) and partially dissolved in water (right)

Rabbit-skin glue is a type of animal glue used as a sizing and an adhesive. It is essentially refined rabbit collagen. The glue has been used for centuries for stretching and priming canvases for oil painting. It is also an ingredient in traditional gesso.

== History ==
In traditional oil painting as practiced by the Renaissance painter, skin glue was used to seal the canvas. This is necessary because the linseed oil that forms the base of most oil paint contains linolenic acid that will destroy the canvas fibers over time. Renaissance artists also knew that pure size (hide glue) became brittle once dry, and would mix it with oil and chalk to make a "half-ground" for canvases. Pure hide glue was usually applied only to rigid supports like panels. Though this does help to seal the canvas or panel, artists still applied a layer of "oil ground", which was often lead-based paint, in order to provide a binding layer for the final oil paint to adhere to.

== Production ==
Rabbit-skin glue is an animal glue created by prolonged boiling of animal connective tissue. Rabbit-skin glue can be bought in powder form, in little pellets, or in larger chunks. Preparation involves using the correct proportion of water to glue to achieve the correct consistency and strength. The mixture should be heated to just below the boiling point. Too much heat results in a product with reduced adhesive qualities. Manufacturers of rabbit, cow, and horse hide glues recommend dissolving at 60–63 °C (140–145 °F).

== Uses ==
=== Adhesive ===
As an adhesive, rabbit-skin glue is used in the production of the bellows of concertinas, and in other small, lightweight instruments—prominently in violins. Its supreme advantages are very fast bonding, and easy debonding with hot water to allow an instrument to be disassembled for internal repairs if needed. It also has very low creep, which is the tendency of some glues to plastically yield under even low but consistent stresses over time. For example, guitar bridges are subject to high lateral stresses that, with the wrong glue, can lead it to creep forward.

The proteins of the glue soak into the wood and interlace with its pores. Setting of the glue occurs with cooling and drying, so the working time is very short, on the order of minutes, to stick the parts together and get full strength; by comparison, PVA glue might provide 20–30 minutes of working time.

Since rabbit-skin glue only works by microscopically stitching the wood fibers together, any gaps in a joint will not be filled, so the mating surfaces must be very smooth to achieve successful adhesion.

=== Sizing ===
When used in painting as a sizing, rabbit-skin glue is spread evenly over a canvas that has been placed on a stretcher. When the glue dries, the canvas tightens. The canvas should be left to dry in normal room temperature for at least 12 hours. Under no circumstances should the drying canvas be placed under harsh sunlight or other heat, because the glue will start to crack. Air humidity also affects how tight the canvas will dry. Once the canvas is dry, a second layer of glue should be spread on the canvas and left to dry again. After this, if needed, the canvas can be lightly sanded flat. Then an oil-based primer is applied.

A canvas sized with rabbit-skin glue can be made tighter than with other alternatives—such as an acrylic-based gesso—because of the shrinkage. This type of canvas is also valuable because it can be sanded to a flatter texture, which allows the painter to achieve a finer level of detail than can be achieved with a typical acrylic gesso ground.

A rabbit-skin glue ground is only appropriate for use under oil paint. Acrylic-based media will flake off a canvas prepared with rabbit-skin glue and are therefore not appropriate.

Rabbit-skin glue is considered to be a major cause of cracking in oil paintings by most modern conservators. Because the glue is hygroscopic, it continually absorbs moisture from the atmosphere, causing the glue to swell and shrink as ambient humidity levels change. Over many humidity cycles, this repeated flexing causes the brittle oil paint to crack. Modern substitutes for rabbit-skin glue are available, such as Gamblin's PVA size and Golden Acrylics’ GAC100. Although these substitutes are still very slightly hygroscopic, they are much less hygroscopic than rabbit-skin glue, and should not cause damage the way rabbit-skin glue does. However, these modern replacements do not stiffen and tighten the canvas as well as rabbit-skin glue, so some artists still prefer to use rabbit-skin glue.

== See also ==
- Sizing
- Animal glue
- Primer (paint)
