= Sizing =

Protective glaze for paper or fabric

Sizing or size is a substance that is applied to, or incorporated into, other materials—especially papers and textiles—to act as a protective filler or glaze. Sizing is used in papermaking and textile manufacturing to change the absorption and wear characteristics of those materials.

Sizing is used for oil-based surface preparation for gilding (sometimes called mordant in this context). It is used by painters and artists to prepare paper and textile surfaces for some art techniques. Sizing is used in photography to increase the sharpness of a print, to change the glossiness of a print, or for other purposes depending on the type of paper and printing technique.

Fibers used in composite materials are treated with various sizing agents to promote adhesion with the matrix material.

Sizing is used during paper manufacture to reduce the paper's tendency when dry to absorb liquid, with the goal of allowing inks and paints to remain on the surface of the paper and to dry there, rather than be absorbed into the paper. This provides a more consistent, economical, and precise printing, painting, and writing surface. This is achieved by curbing the paper fibers' tendency to absorb liquids by capillary action. In addition, sizing affects abrasiveness, creasability, finish, printability, smoothness, and surface bond strength and decreases surface porosity and fuzzing.

There are three categories of papers with respect to sizing: unsized (water-leaf), weak sized (slack sized), and strong sized (hard sized). Waterleaf has low water resistance and includes absorbent papers for blotting. Slack sized paper is somewhat absorbent and includes newsprint, while hard sized papers have the highest water resistance, such as coated fine papers and liquid packaging board.

There are two types of sizing: internal sizing, sometimes also called engine sizing, and surface sizing (tub sizing). Internal sizing is applied to almost all papers and especially to all those that are machine made, while surface sizing is added for the highest grade bond, ledger, and writing papers.

== Surface sizing ==
Surface sizing solutions consist of mainly modified starches and sometimes other hydrocolloids, such as gelatine, or surface sizing agents such as acrylic co-polymers. Surface sizing agents are amphiphilic molecules, having both hydrophilic (water-loving) and hydrophobic (water-repelling) ends. The sizing agent adheres to substrate fibers and forms a film, with the hydrophilic tail facing the fiber and the hydrophobic tail facing outwards, resulting in a smooth finish that tends to be water-repellent. Sizing improves the surface strength, printability, and water resistance of the paper or material to which it is applied. In the sizing solution, optical brightening agents (OBA) may also be added to improve the opacity and whiteness of the paper or material surface.

== Internal sizing ==
Usual internal sizing chemicals used in papermaking at the wet end are alkyl ketene dimer (AKD) and alkyl succinic anhydride (ASA) in neutral pH conditions, and the more ancient rosin system which requires acidic conditions and is still used in some mills.

== Preservation ==
While sizing is intended to make paper more suitable for printing, acidic sizing using rosin also makes printing paper less durable and poses a problem for preservation of printed documents.

Sizing with starch was introduced quite early in the history of papermaking. Dard Hunter in Papermaking through Eighteen Centuries corroborates this by writing, "The Chinese used starch as a size for paper as early as A.D. 768 and its use continued until the fourteenth century when animal glue was substituted." In the early modern paper mills in Europe, which produced paper for printing and other uses, the sizing agent of choice was gelatin, as Susan Swartzburg writes in Preserving Library Materials': "Various substances have been used for sizing through the ages, from gypsum to animal gelatin." Hunter describes the process of sizing in these paper mills in the following:

The drying completed, the old papermakers dipped their paper into an animal size that had been made from the parings of hides, which they procured from the parchment-makers. It was necessary to size that paper so that it would be impervious to ink, but sizing was more needed in writing than in printing papers. Many books of the fifteenth century were printed upon paper that had not been sized, this extra treatment not being essential for a type impression. The sizing was accomplished by a worker holding a number of sheets by the aid of two wooden sticks, and dipping the paper into the warm gelatinous liquid. The sheets were then pressed to extract the superfluous gelatine. This crude method of sizing the paper was extremely wasteful as many sheets were torn and bruised beyond use. The sizing room of the early paper mills, was, for this reason, known as the 'slaughter-house'.

With the advent of the mass production of paper, the type of size used for paper production also changed. As Swartzburg writes, "By 1850 rosin size had come into use. Unfortunately, it produces a chemical action that hastens the decomposition of even the finest papers." In the field of library preservation it is known "that acid hydrolysis of cellulose and related carbo-hydrates [sic] is one of the key factors responsible for the degradation of paper during ageing." Some professional work has focused on the specific processes involved in the degradation of rosin-sized paper, in addition to work on developing permanent paper and sizing agents that will not eventually destroy the paper. An issue on the periphery to the preservation of paper and sizing, is washing, which is described by V. Daniels and J. Kosek as, "The removal of discolouration ... in water is principally effected by the dissolution of water-soluble material; this is usually done by immersing paper in water." In such a process, surface level items applied to the paper, such as size in early paper making processes as seen above, have the possibility of being removed from the paper, which might have some item specific interest in a special collections library. With later processes in paper making being more akin to "engine sizing," as H. Hardman and E. J. Cole describe it, "Engine sizing, which is part of the manufacturing process, has the ingredients added to the furnish or stock prior to sheet formation," the concern for the removal of size is less, and as such, most literature focuses on the more pressing issue of preserving acidic papers and similar issues.

== Gilding ==
Sizing is a term used for any substance which is applied to a surface before gilding in order to ensure adhesion of the thin gold layer to the substrate. Egg whites have often been used as sizing; the Ancient Egyptians sometimes used blood. Other commonly used traditional materials for gold leaf sizing are rabbit-skin glue diluted and heated in water (water gilding), and boiled linseed oil (oil gilding); modern materials include polyvinyl acetate.

== Textile warp sizing ==
On the weaving machine, warp yarns are subjected to several types of actions i.e. cyclic strain, flexing, abrasion at various loom parts, and inter-yarn friction, potentially resulting in breakage of the yarn. Breakage of the yarn results in production stops on the weaving machine. The process that is used to improve the strength—abrasion resistance—of the warp yarn and reduce its hairiness is called textile warp sizing or tape sizing.

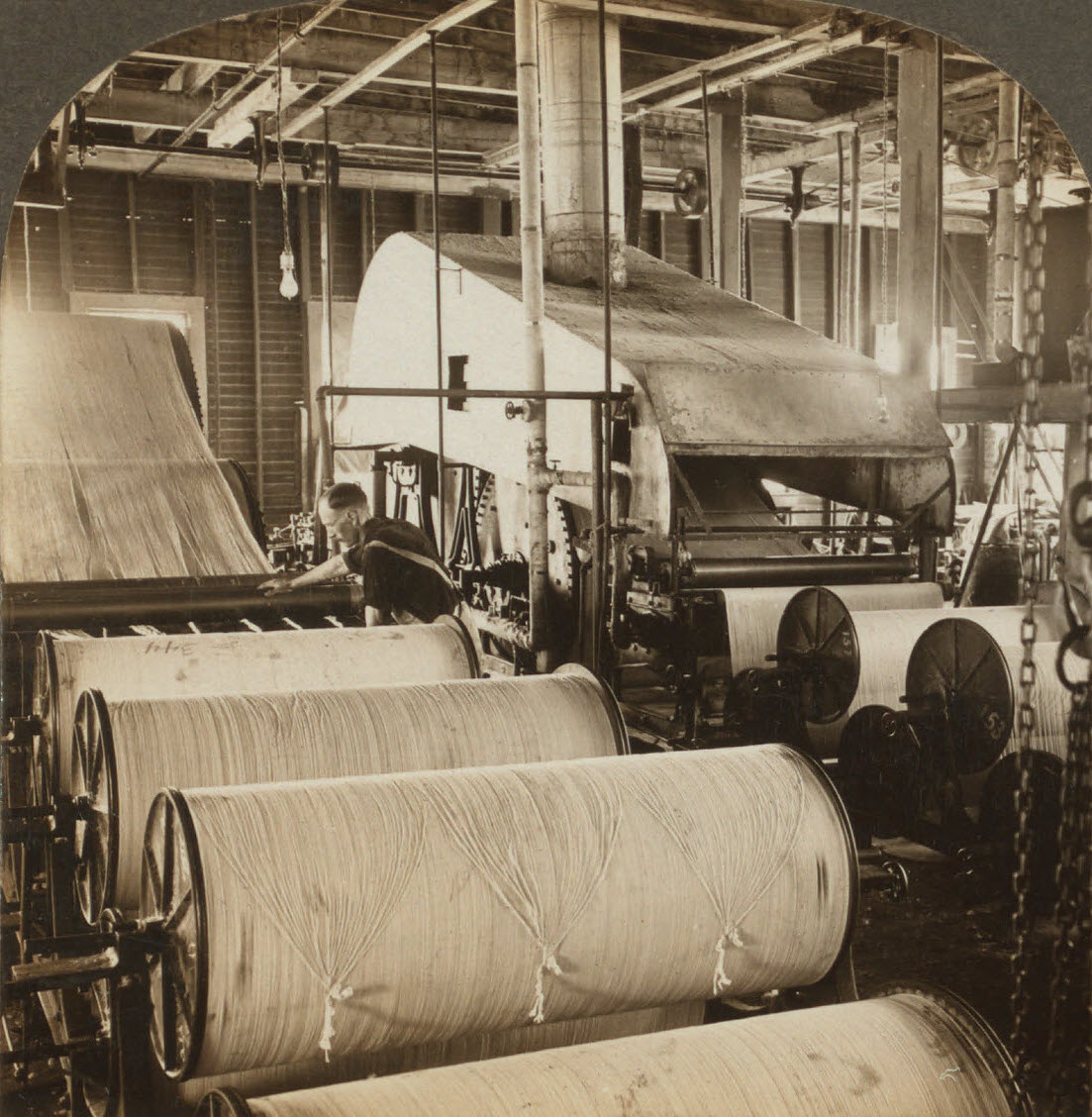
Sizing the warp

The degree of improvement of strength depends on adhesion force between fiber and size, size penetration, as well as encapsulation of yarn. The type of yarn material (e.g. cotton, polyester, linen), the thickness of the yarn, and the type of weaving machinery will determine the sizing recipe. Textile sizing agents usually consist of water-soluble polymers, such as modified starch, polyvinyl alcohol (PVA), carboxymethyl cellulose (CMC), acrylates, wax and mutton tallow.

Sizing may be done by hand, or in a (warp) sizing machine After the weaving process, the fabric is washed to remove residues of the sizing compounds.

== Canvas sizing for oil painting ==
Preparation of canvas for the oil painting always includes sizing: the canvas will "rot" if directly exposed to the paint. Aqueous glue, frequently the hide glue was used for sizing the canvas for centuries, Size in art is not a replacement for ground: it is not intended to form a level surface for painting, it is used to simply fill pores and isolate the canvas from the actual ground.

== See also ==
- Acid-free paper
- Paper chemicals
- Preservation (library and archival science)
- Size
- Surface chemistry of paper
- Textile manufacturing

== Sources ==
- Mayer, Ralph (September 1970). The Artist's Handbook of Materials and Techniques (3rd ed.). New York: Viking Books. ISBN 9780670136650.
