= Composition ornament =

Mouldable thermoplastic used for decorative work

Composition ornament ("compo") is a mouldable thermoplastic compound, consisting of powdered chalk mixed with collagen (hide glue), resin (pine rosin) and linseed oil in ratio 1 to 1 to 1 by volume.; worked either by hand or more usually pressed into moulds to produce decorative work. It's now most commonly seen as part of gilded picture frames, but was in use for many smaller decorative mouldings from the later part of the Baroque period.

== Compo recipes ==
A basic compo recipe can have many variations.

Some understanding of what each ingredient is doing helps when adjusting the basic recipe, starting with the four essential ingredients:

- Whiting gives body.
- Pearl glue acts as a binder.
- Linseed oil makes the mixture soft.
- Rosin makes the mixture elastic.

With optional ingredients, including:

- Venice turpentine prevents cracking.
- Glycerine tempers the glue.
- Zinc oxide prevents formation of mould.

== History ==
Composition is widely accepted to have been developed by Thomas Jackson in London around the late 18th century. His son, George Jackson, continued the business. His company, George Jackson, still trades today and supplies composition ornament made to the original methods and recipe.
