= The Artist's Handbook of Materials and Techniques =

Reference book by Ralph Mayer

- 1971 edition
- Author: Ralph Mayer
- Language: English
- Subject: Artistic media, Painting
- Published: 1940 (Viking)
- Publication place: United States
- Pages: 761
- ISBN: 9780670837014
- OCLC: 22178945

The Artist's Handbook of Materials and Techniques is a reference book by Ralph Mayer (1895–1979). Intended by the author for use by professional artists, it deals mostly with the chemical and physical properties of traditional painterly materials such as oil, tempera, and encaustic, as well as solvents, varnishes, and painting mediums. It also has extensive coverage of ancillary activities such as stretching and preparing canvas, care and maintenance of tools, and conservation of older paintings.

Originally published in 1940, the Handbook was referred to as "the painter's bible" at the time, and still remains on the reading list in American universities. It underwent three extensive revisions during Mayer's lifetime, and the fifth posthumous edition is still in print.

Ralph Mayer's archives of writing and research on materials and techniques are now at the Ralph Mayer Learning Center, Yale University School of Art.
