= Xylotechnigraphy =

Decorative treatment to wood

Xylotechnigraphy is an architectural term for a decorative treatment to wood. By staining, finishing, and graining, the wood resembles a more expensive or finer type. The process was invented by A. F. Brophy and patented in England in 1871.

In a paper read before a meeting of the Royal Institute of British Architects three years after xylotechnigraphy was patented, G. T. Robinson described it as "in principle exceedingly simple. ... To ceilings, doors, dados in our private houses, to partitions and fittings of our banks and commercial offices, this process is, I conceive, exceedingly applicable, and to our larger and less movable pieces of furniture it is not misapplied, though I confess to a lurking dislike to it in those lesser articles to which true inlay, by reason of their smaller process, seems more aesthetically appropriate."

In the same paper, Robinson quoted the patent in which Brophy detailed the process:

In order to stain wood in various colours, according to any suitable design, leaving, if desired, parts of the wood unstained, so as to obtain an imitation of inlay, I proceed as follows: I first apply a varnish or solution which will fill the pores of the wood, and exclude the staining liquid from such parts of the surface as are to remain unstained, then when the varnish or solution is dry, I apply over the whole surface the lightest stain I intend to use; this stain being dry I again apply the varnish, or stopping, coating with it such parts of the surface as I desire to retain of a colour corresponding to the lightest stain, and so I proceed until the desired effect is obtained, the last stain applied being usually black or a very dark stain. The surface having been cleared off may, if desired, be varnished or polished all over, or it may remain as it is left by the last staining process.

== See also ==
- Inlay
- Varnish
- Wood stain
- Wood finishing
