= Ammonia fuming =

Wood-finishing process

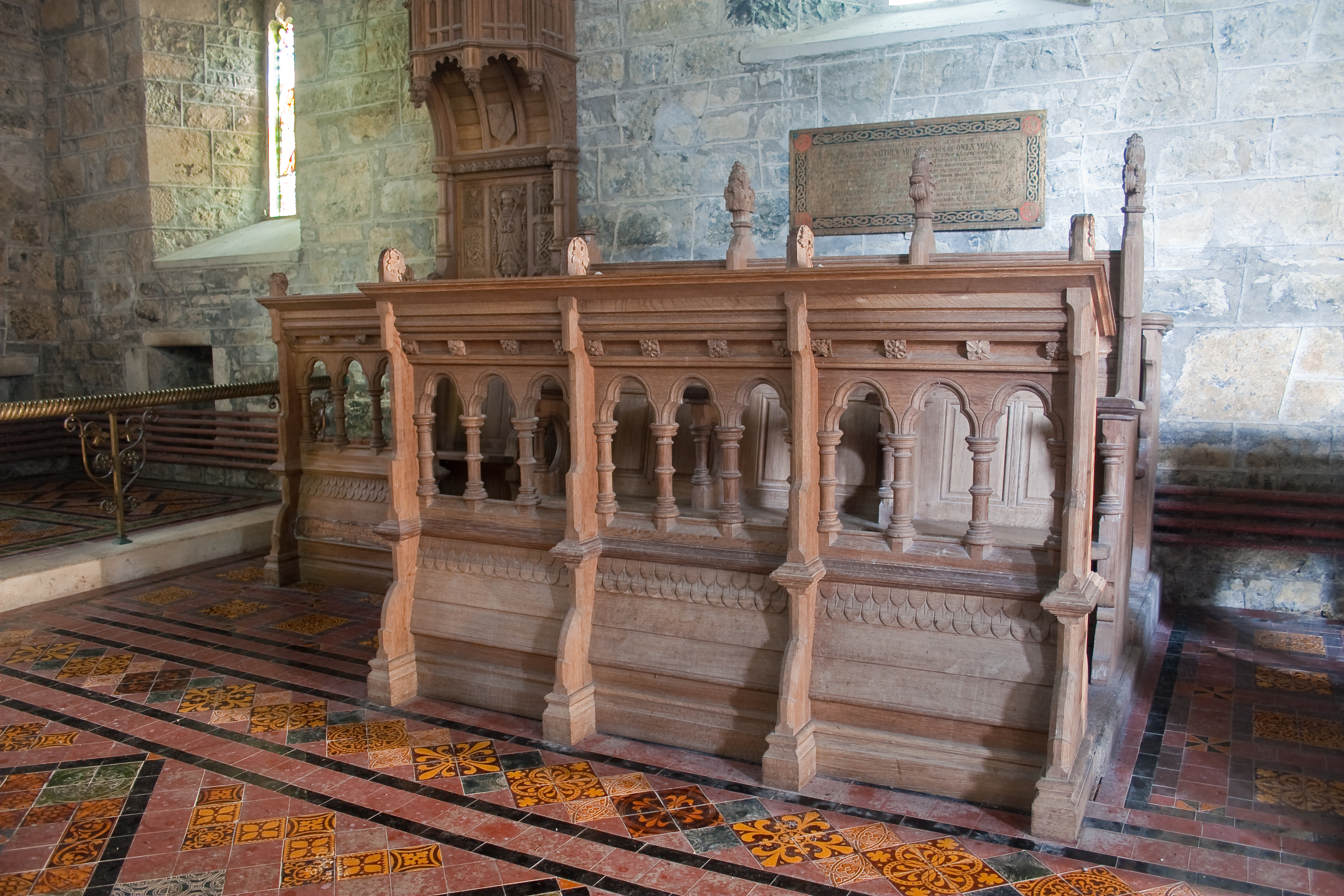
Fumed oak choir stalls at Clonfert Cathedral, Ireland

Ammonia fuming is a wood-finishing process which darkens wood and brings out the grain pattern. Fuming involves exposing the wood to fumes from a strong aqueous solution of ammonium hydroxide which reacts with the tannins in the wood. The process works best on white oak because of the high tannin-content of this wood. Fumed oak is also called fumigated oak or smoked oak. Other species may also be fumed, but usually will not darken as much as white oak. In America, the introduction of the process is usually associated with the activities of the furniture-maker Gustav Stickley at the beginning of the 20th century, but fuming was known in Europe before this.

== Process ==
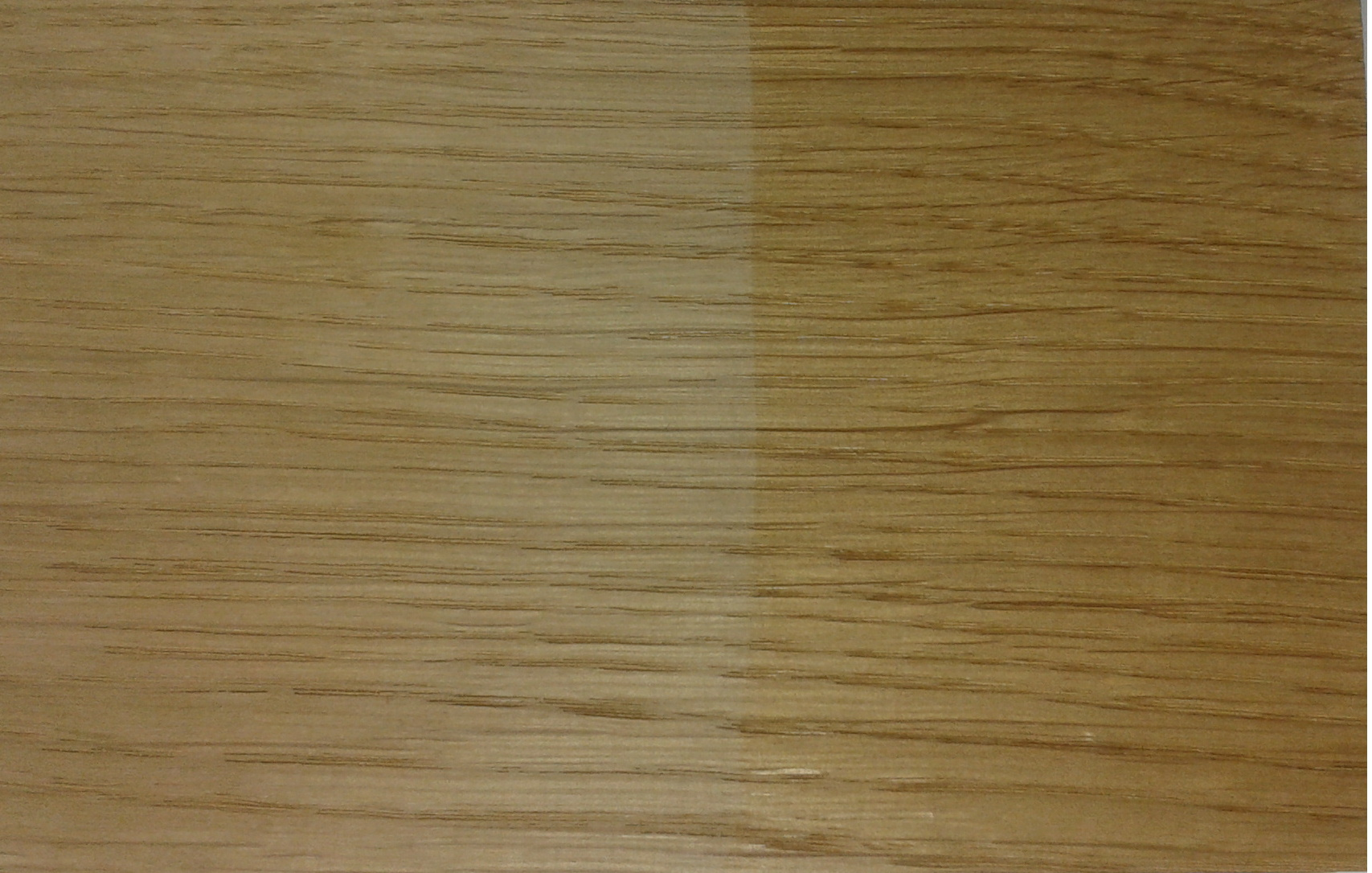
Unfumed European white oak; left side is unfinished, right side is oiled

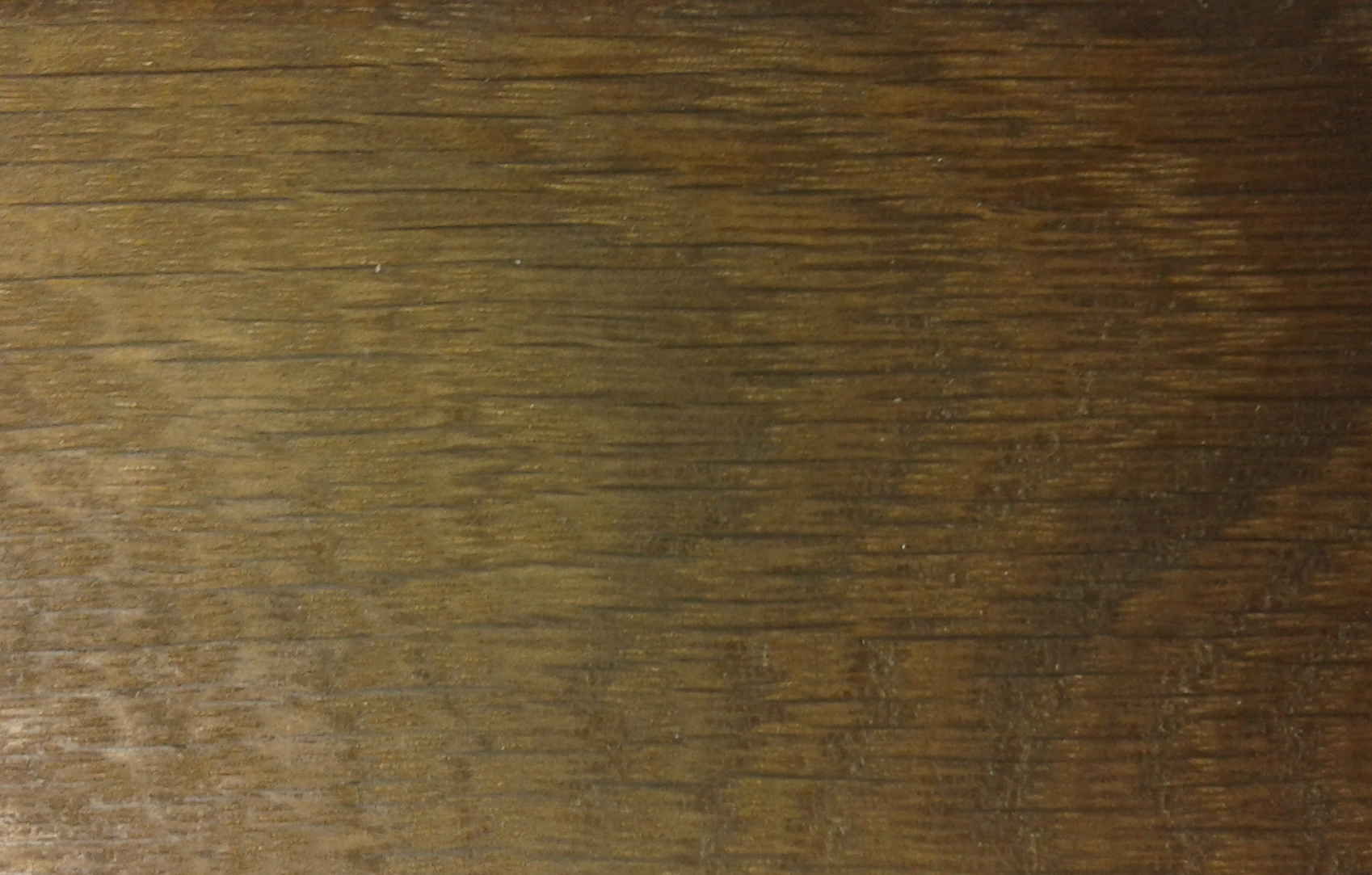
European white oak, overnight fumed and oiled

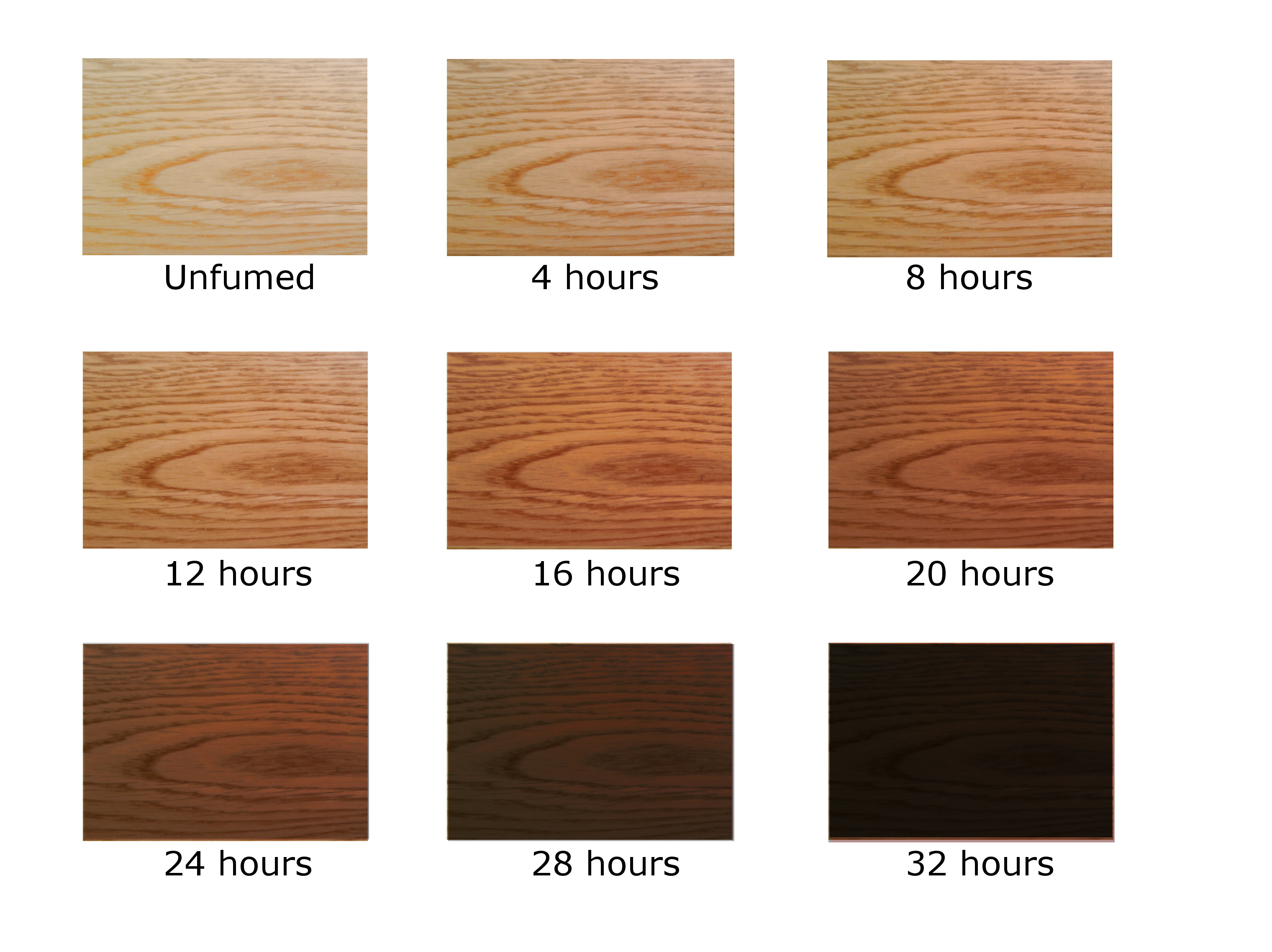
Chart simulating the change in colour of oak with time spent in a fuming chamber

The wood to be fumed is placed in a sealed chamber with all the surfaces to be fumed exposed to freely circulating air. A large shallow container of ammonium hydroxide solution is placed on the floor of the chamber and the chamber is sealed. If the chamber is large or the fuming is to be done for a long time, more than one container may be provided, or the ammonia may be replenished during the process. The fuming time depends on the amount of darkening required, the size of the chamber, and the strength of the ammonia used. It is usual to oil the wood after fuming to fully bring out the effect.

== Advantages and disadvantages ==
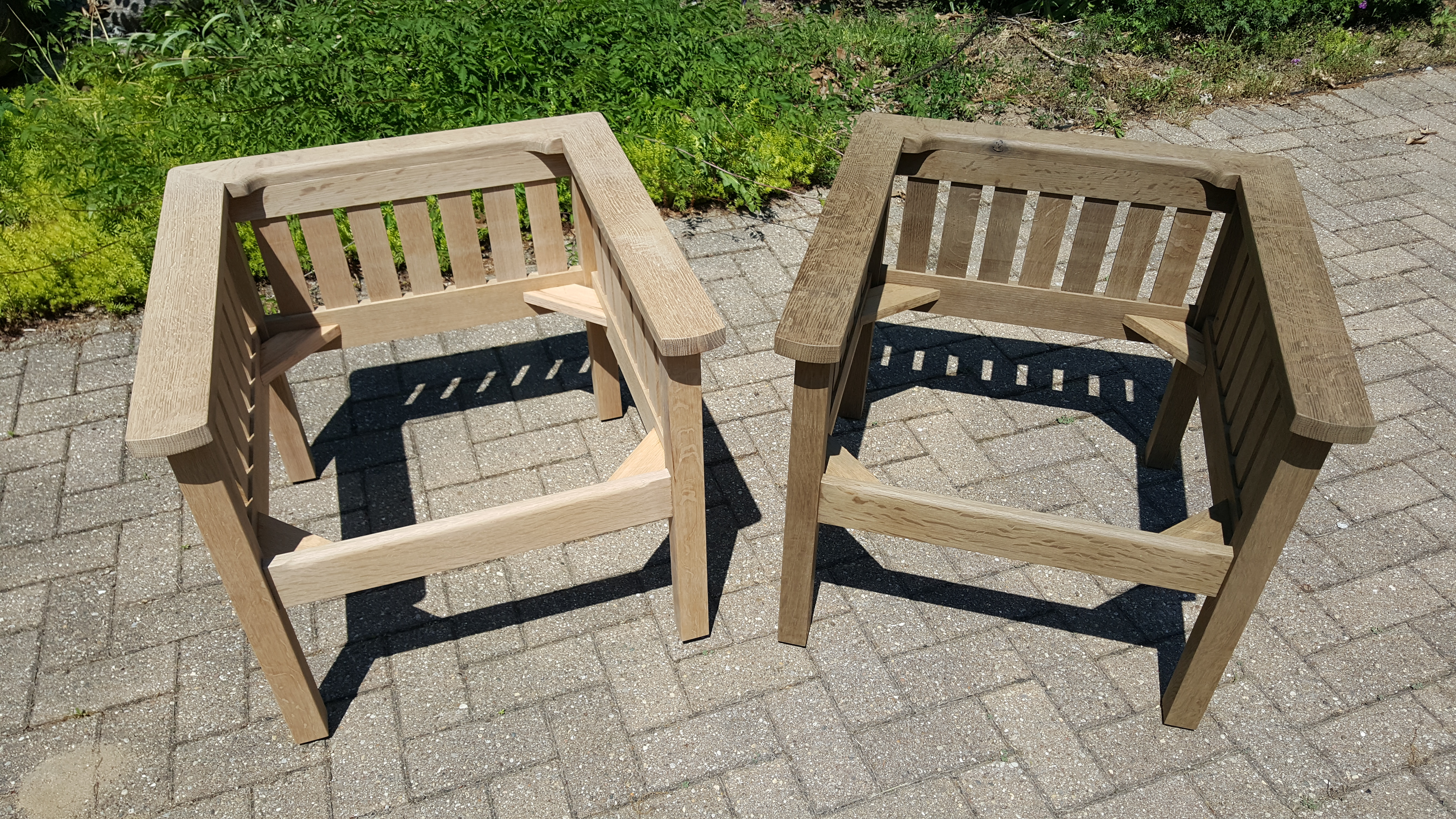
White oak chairs before and after fuming

Fuming has an advantage over staining because it does not obscure the grain, it merely darkens it. Unlike staining, there is no possibility of blotches or runs. Fuming is also colourfast. Fuming has the disadvantage that it is not a precise process. Different batches of wood will react to fuming differently. For this reason, wood to be fumed for a project is often harvested from the same tree. Even so, boards from the same tree, and different regions of the same board, can still have a noticeably different colour. Where a consistent colour is important, staining or aniline dyeing may be better options.

Fuming has some safety issues. The solution of ammonium hydroxide used is much stronger (26% to 30%) than in household ammonia and is corrosive. The fuming must be done in an enclosed sealed chamber. Ammonia splashes can burn skin and the fumes can cause burns to eyes and lungs. Operators need to wear gas masks, gloves and eye protection.

The darkening of the colour relies on the ammonia reacting with tannins in the wood. The process is usually applied to white oak, as this wood has a high tannin content. Red oak may turn greenish rather than deep brown. Other species may not darken as noticeably as white oak, depending on the tannin content. The effect of fuming can be enhanced in non-tannic woods by applying a coat of tannic acid to the surface before fuming.

== History ==
Fuming was an accidental discovery in England after it was noticed that oak boards stored in a stable had darkened. This was caused by the ammonia fumes from the horse urine reacting with the wood. At the end of the 19th and beginning of the 20th centuries fuming became popular with furniture makers in the Arts and Crafts movement. The technique was introduced to the US by Gustav Stickley in 1901 and a manufacturing technique was perfected in the mission style furniture line of the Stickley family business. Stickley also described a method of fuming the wooden architecture of an entire room by placing bowls of ammonia in the room and sealing it. This method was not very practical and quite dangerous for the person placing the ammonia without personal protective equipment available to modern workers. Stickley was quickly followed by other American Arts and Crafts furniture makers such as Charles Limbert and the Roycroft community.

== See also ==
- Fumed Oak, play by Noël Coward

== Bibliography ==
- Cathers, David M. (2003). Gustav Stickley. Phaidon Press. ISBN 0714840300.
- Clark, Michael; Thomas-Clark, Jill (2002). The Stickley Brothers. Gibbs Smith. ISBN 1586850539.
- Hasluck, Paul N. (1977). Manual of Traditional Wood Carving. Courier Dover Publications. ISBN 0486234894.
- Rodel, Kevin (1999). "Fuming with ammonia". Finishes & Finishing Techniques. Taunton Press. pp. 56–60. ISBN 1561582980.
- Smith, Bruce (2004). The Beautiful Necessity: Decorating with Arts and Crafts. Gibbs Smith. ISBN 1423609034.
- Stickley, Gustav (2012). The 1912 and 1915 Gustav Stickley Craftsman Furniture Catalogs. Courier Dover Publications. ISBN 978-0486138763.
