= Standard Paints, Inc. =

- Company type: Private
- Industry: Coatings, paints, and wood-protection products
- Founded: 1952
- Headquarters: Mansfield, Texas, United States
- Area served: United States
- Key people: Brent Turner (President) , Daron Jones (Vice President of Operations), Alix Glodich (Vice President of Research & Development)
- Products: Paint
- Website: http://wooddefender.com

Standard Paints, Inc. is an American manufacturer of industrial and commercial coatings based in Mansfield, Texas. Founded in 1952, the company produces a range of oil-based stains and sealers for wood protection under its flagship brand, Wood Defender. Standard Paints supplies products to fence and deck contractors throughout the United States and operates one of the region's most extensive manufacturing facilities for exterior wood finishes. The company has been recognized by Inc. magazine as a Power Partner Award winner for its contractor support and training programs.

== History ==
Standard Paints was founded in 1952 in Dallas, Texas, where it initially manufactured wood-protection coatings for local housing authorities and residential customers.

In 1999, the company relocated its manufacturing and distribution operations to Mansfield, Texas, expanding its production capacity and national distribution network. The Wood Defender brand was introduced in the mid-1990s as a line of deep-penetrating, oil-based stains designed for professional fence and deck contractors.

== Products ==
Standard Paints manufactures exterior wood-stain products marketed under the Wood Defender brand. The stains are formulated for single-coat application without back-brushing and claim protection against water, UV rays, and mildew. The company also maintains an in-house laboratory where chemists test production batches for formula accuracy, consistency, and performance.

== Training and Contractor Programs ==
Standard Paints offers training and certification programs for contractors via the Wood Defender brand, including courses accredited by the American Fence Association.

== Recognition ==
In 2024, Inc. magazine named Wood Defender (by Standard Paints) as a Power Partner Award winner, recognizing the company among B2B suppliers that support entrepreneurs and contractor-business growth.

== Facilities ==
The company's manufacturing and distribution facility is located at 940 S. 6th Avenue, Mansfield, Texas 76063.

== See also ==
- Wood stain
