= Wood finishing =

Process of refining or protecting a wooden surface

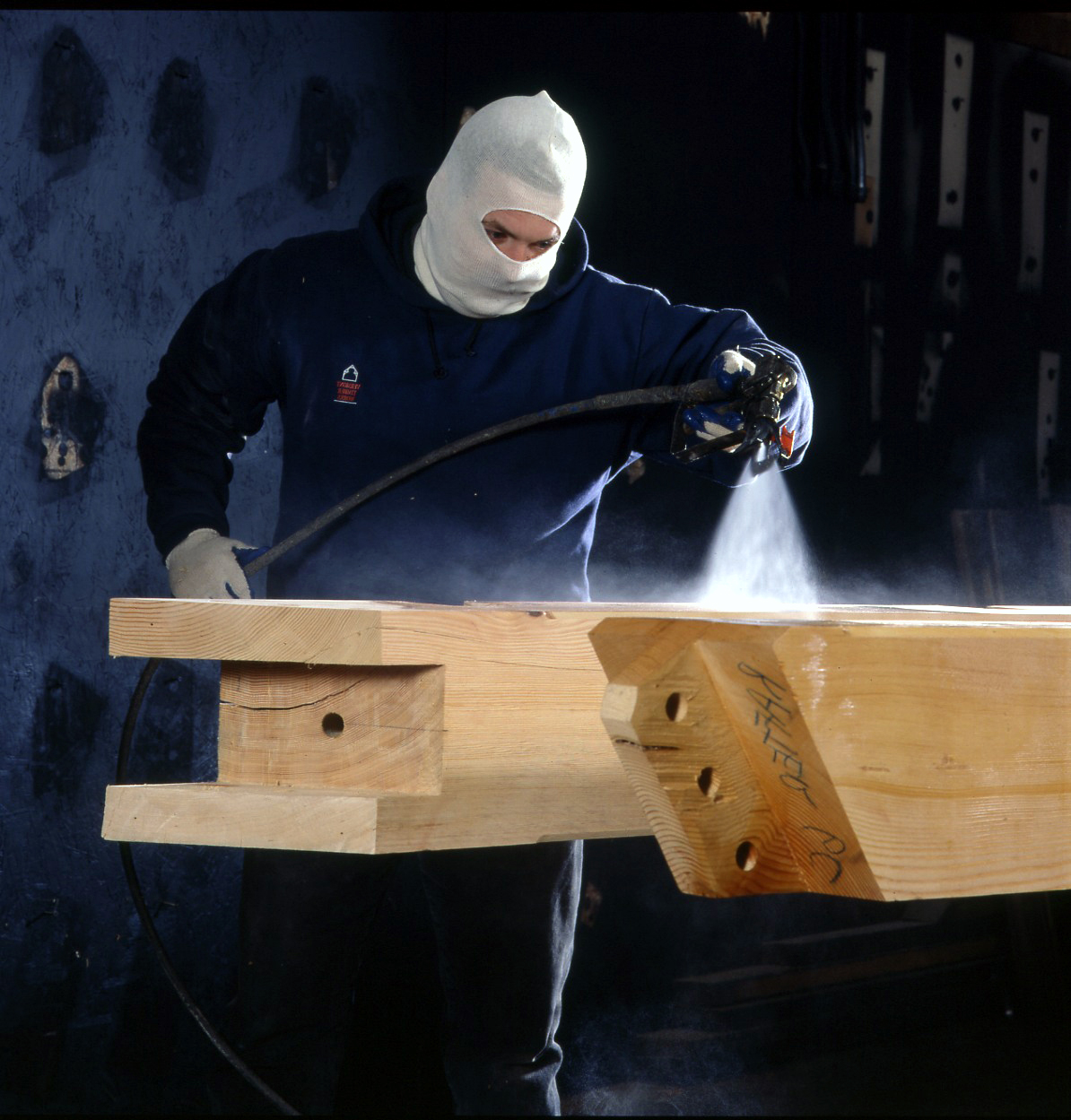
A worker sprays a urethane finish onto a timber

Wood finishing refers to the process of refining or protecting a wooden surface, especially in the production of furniture where typically it represents between 5 and 30% of manufacturing costs.

Finishing is one of the final steps of the manufacturing process that gives wood surfaces desirable characteristics, including enhanced appearance and increased resistance to moisture and other environmental agents. Finishing can also make wood easier to clean and keep it sanitized, sealing pores that can be breeding grounds for bacteria. Finishing can also influence other wood properties, for example tonal qualities of musical instruments and hardness of flooring. In addition, finishing provides a way of giving low-value woods the appearance of ones that are expensive and difficult to obtain.

== Planning the finish ==
Finishing of wood requires careful planning to ensure that the finished piece looks attractive, performs well in service and meets safety and environmental requirements. Planning for finishing begins with the design of furniture. Care should be taken to ensure that edges of furniture are rounded so they can be adequately coated and are able to resist wear and cracking. Careful attention should also be given to the design and strength of wooden joints to ensure they do not open-up in service and crack the overlying finish. Care should also be taken to eliminate recesses in furniture, which are difficult to finish with some systems, especially UV-cured finishes.

Planning for wood finishing also involves consideration of the properties of the wood being finished, as these can greatly affect the appearance and performance of the finish, and as such, the type of finishing system that will give the wood the desired characteristics. For example, woods that show great variation in colour between sapwood and heartwood or within heartwood may require a preliminary staining step to reduce colour variation. Alternatively, the wood can be bleached to remove the natural colour of the wood and then stained to the desired colour. Woods that are coarse textured such as oaks and other ring-porous hardwoods may need to be filled before they are finished to ensure the coating can bridge the pores and resist cracking. The pores in ring-porous woods more readily absorb pigmented stain, and advantage can be taken of this to highlight the wood's grain. Some tropical woods, such as rosewood (Dalbergia nigra), cocobolo (Dalbergia retusa) and African padauk (Pterocarpus soyauxii), contain extractives such as quinones, which retard the curing of unsaturated polyester and UV-cured acrylate coatings, and so other finishing systems should be used with these species.

Planning for wood finishing also involves being aware of how the finishing process influences the result. Careful handling of the wood is needed to avoid dents, scratches and soiling with dirt. Wood should be marked for cutting using pencil rather than ink; however, avoid hard or soft pencil. HB (standard #2) is recommend for face work and 2H (hard grade graphite) for joint work. Care should be taken to avoid squeeze-out of glue from joints because the glue will reduce absorption of stain and finish. Any excess glue should be carefully removed to avoid further damage to the wood.

Wood's moisture content affects the staining of wood. Changes in wood moisture content can result in swelling and shrinkage of wood which can stress and crack coatings. Both problems can be avoided by storing wood indoors in an environment where it can equilibriate to a recommended moisture content (6 to 8%) that is similar to that of the intended end use of the furniture.

Finally, consideration needs to be given to whether the finished wood will come into contact with food, in which case a food-safe finish should be used, local environmental regulations governing the use of finishes, and recycling of finished wood at the end of its life.

== Sanding ==
Sanding may be carried out before finishing to remove defects from the wood surface that will affect the appearance and performance of finishes that are subsequently applied to the wood. These defects include cutter marks and burns, scratches and indentations, small glue spots and raised grain. Sanding should not be used to eliminate larger defects such as gouges, and various forms of discolouration. Other techniques are used to remove these defects (see below).

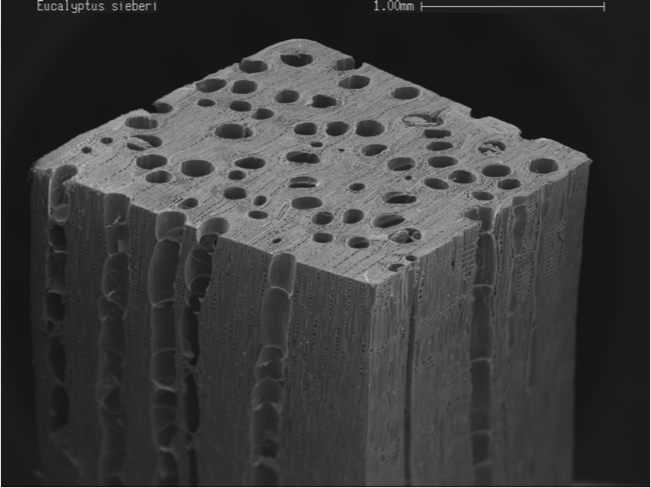
Large open ‘pores’ in Eucalyptus sieberi

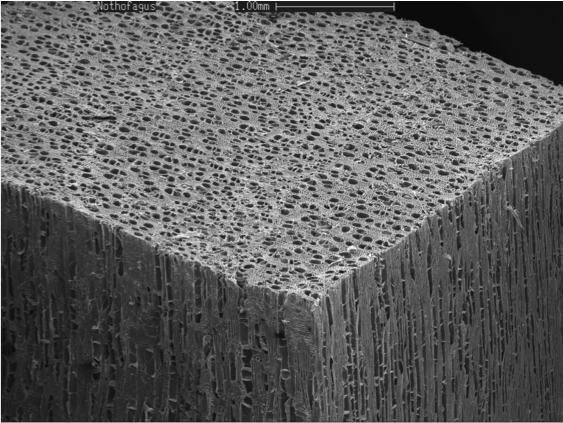
Pore distribution in southern beech

The key to preparing a defect-free surface when sanding is to develop a sanding schedule that will quickly eliminate defects and leave the surface smooth enough so that tiny scratches produced by sanding cannot be seen when the wood is finished. A sanding schedule usually begins with sandpaper that is coarse enough to remove larger defects (typically 80 or 100 grit, but sometimes higher if the surface is already quite smooth), and progresses through a series of sandpaper grades that gradually remove the sanding scratches created by the previous sanding steps. A typical sanding schedule prior to wood finishing might involve sanding wood along the grain with 80-, 100-, 120-, 150-, and finishing with 180- and sometimes 220-grit. The precise sanding schedule is a matter of trial and error because the appearance of a sanded surface depends on the wood one is sanding and the finish that will subsequently be applied to the wood. According to Nagyszalanczy, coarse-grained woods with large pores such as oak hide sanding scratches better than fine-grained wood and hence with such species it may be possible to use 180- or even 150-grit sandpaper as the final step in the sanding schedule. Conversely, sanding scratches are more easily seen in finer-grained, harder woods and also end-grain; hence, they require finer sandpaper (220-grit) during the final sanding stage. The sandpaper selected for the final sanding stage affects the colour of stained wood, and therefore when staining is part of finishing, avoid sanding the wood to a very smooth finish. On the other hand, according to Nagyszalanczy, if using an oil-based finish, it is desirable to sand the wood using higher grit sandpaper (400-grit) because oil tends to highlight sanding scratches.

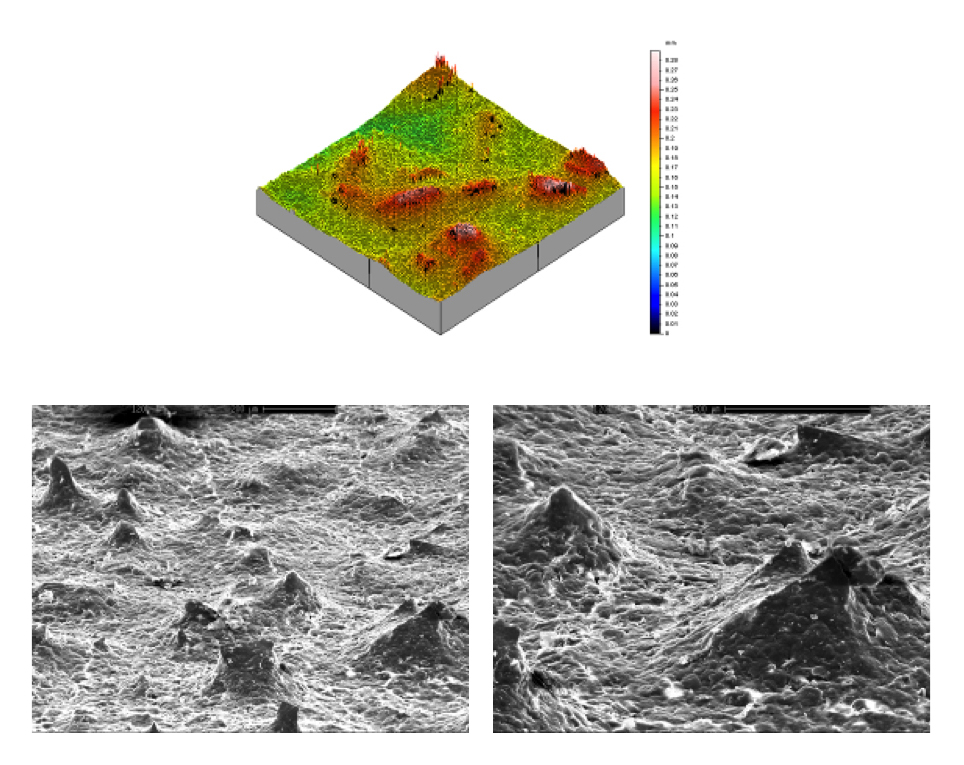
Scanning Electron Microscopy of 120 grit aluminum oxide paper

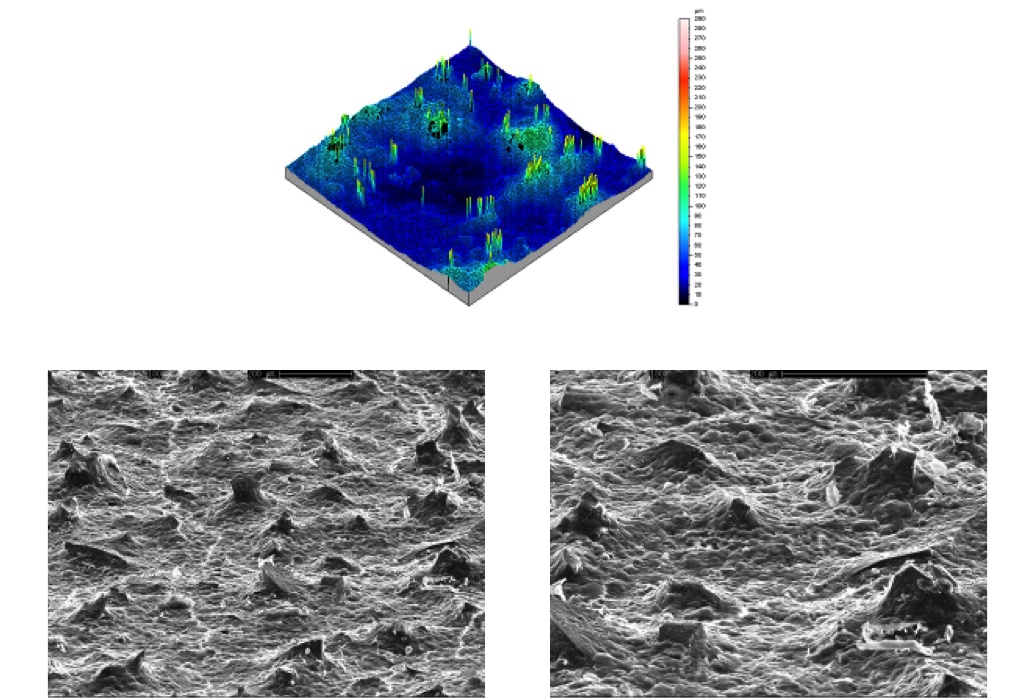
Scanning Electron Microscopy of 180 grit aluminum oxide paper

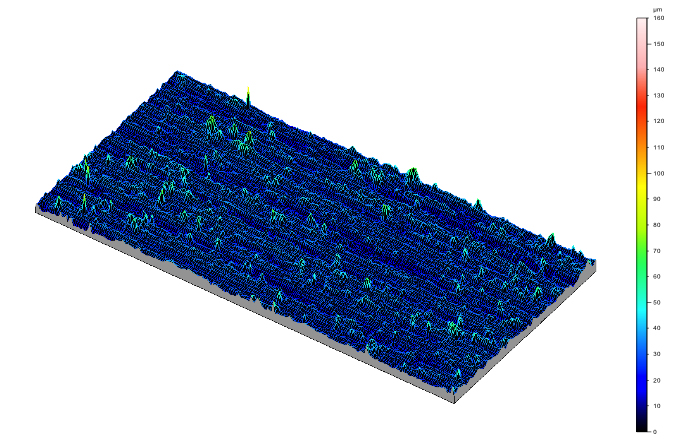
Profilometry image of Yellow birch after sanding

Sanding is good at removing defects of a wood surface, but it creates a surface that contains minute scratches in the form of microscopic valleys and ridges, and also slivers of wood cell-wall material that are attached to the underlying wood. These sanding ridges and slivers of wood swell and spring-up, respectively, when sanded wood is finished with water-based finishes, creating a rough, fuzzy surface. This defect is known as grain raising. It can be eliminated by wetting the surface with water, leaving the wood to dry, and then lightly sanding the wood to remove the raised grain.

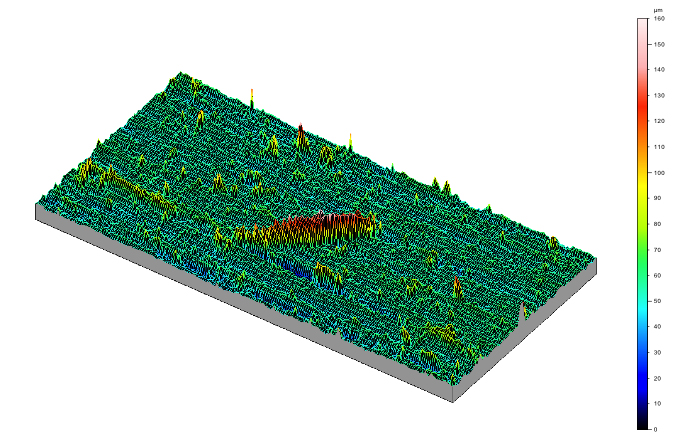
Profilometry image of Yellow birch after sanding and wetting

=== Removing larger defects ===
Larger defects that interfere with wood finishing include dents, gouges, splits, and glue spots and smears. These defects should also be removed before finishing; otherwise, they will affect the quality of the finished object. However, it is difficult to eliminate large defects from wood surfaces.

Removing dents from wood surfaces was explained by Flexner. Add a few droplets of demineralized water to the dent and let it soak in. Then put a clean cloth over the dent and place the tip of a hot iron on the cloth that lies immediately above the dent, taking great care not to burn the wood. The transfer of heat from the iron to the wood will cause compressed fibres in the dent to recover their original dimensions. As a result, the dent will diminish in size or even disappear completely, although removal of large dents may require a number of wetting and heating cycles. The wood in the recovered dent should then be dried and sanded smooth to match the surrounding wood.

Gouges and holes in wood are more difficult to repair than dents because wood fibres have been cut, torn, and removed from the wood. Larger gouges and splits are best repaired by patching the void with a piece of wood that matches the colour and grain orientation of the wood under repair. Patching wood requires skill, but when done properly, it is possible to create a repair that is very difficult to see. An alternative to patching is filling (sometimes known as stopping). Numerous coloured fillers (putties and waxes) are produced commercially and are coloured to match different wood species. Successful filling of voids in wood requires the filler to precisely match the colour and grain pattern of the wood around the void, which is difficult to achieve in practice. Furthermore, filled voids do not behave like wood during subsequent finishing steps, and they age differently to wood. Hence, repairs to wood using fillers may be noticeable. Therefore, filling is best used with opaque finishes rather than semitransparent finishes, which allow the grain of the wood to be seen.

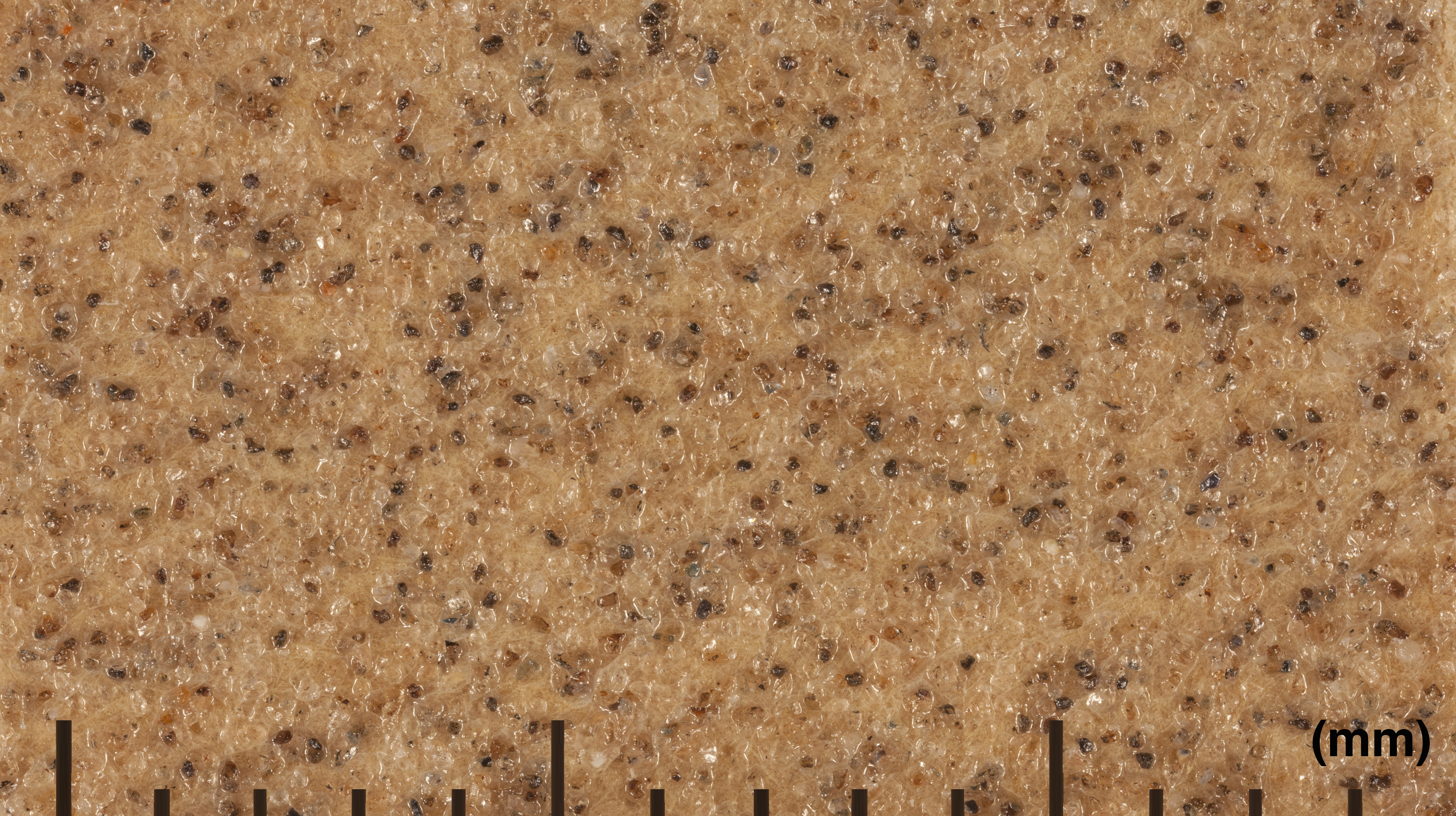
Macro photo of 120 grit sandpaper

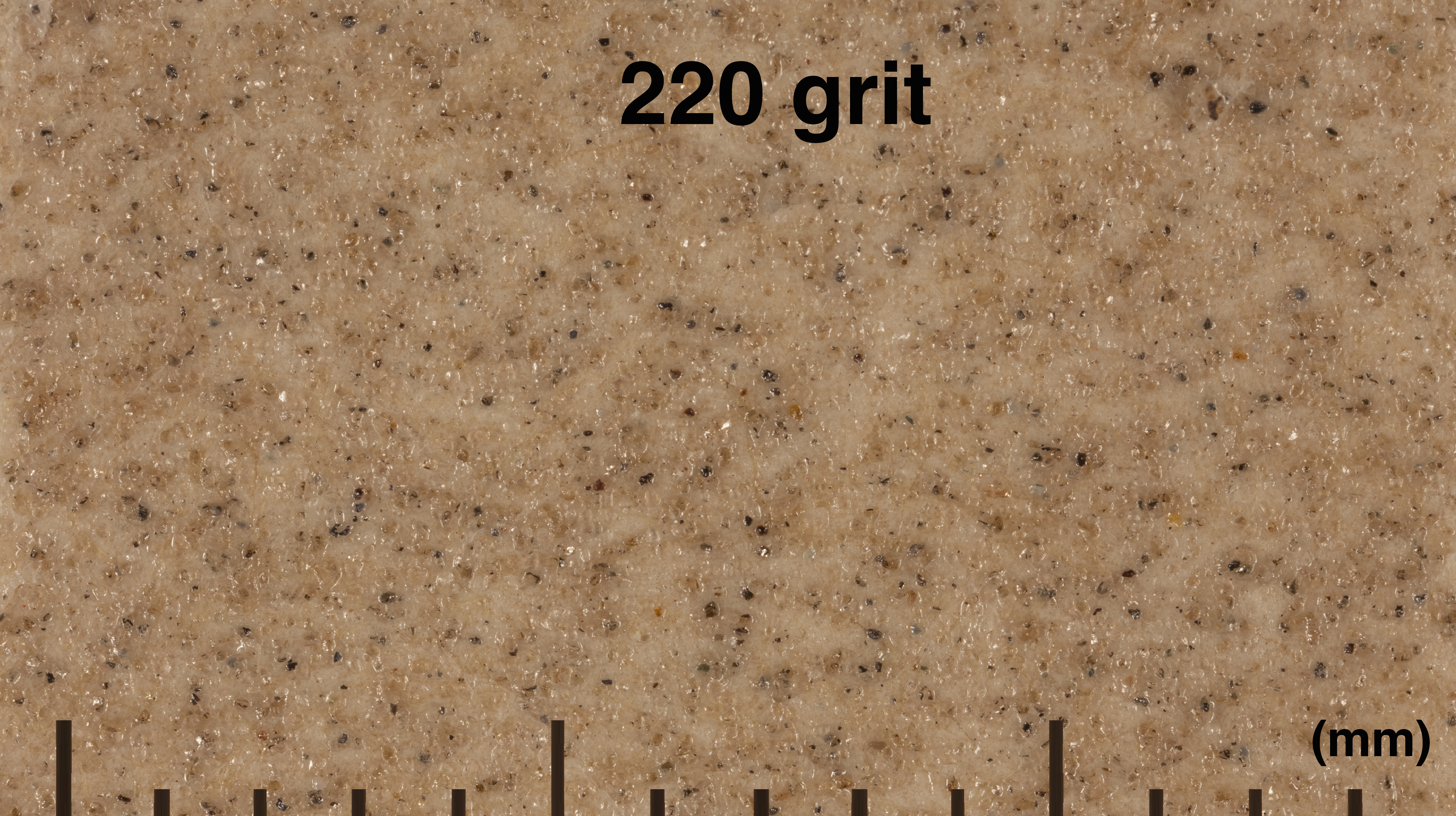
Macro photo of 220 grit sandpaper

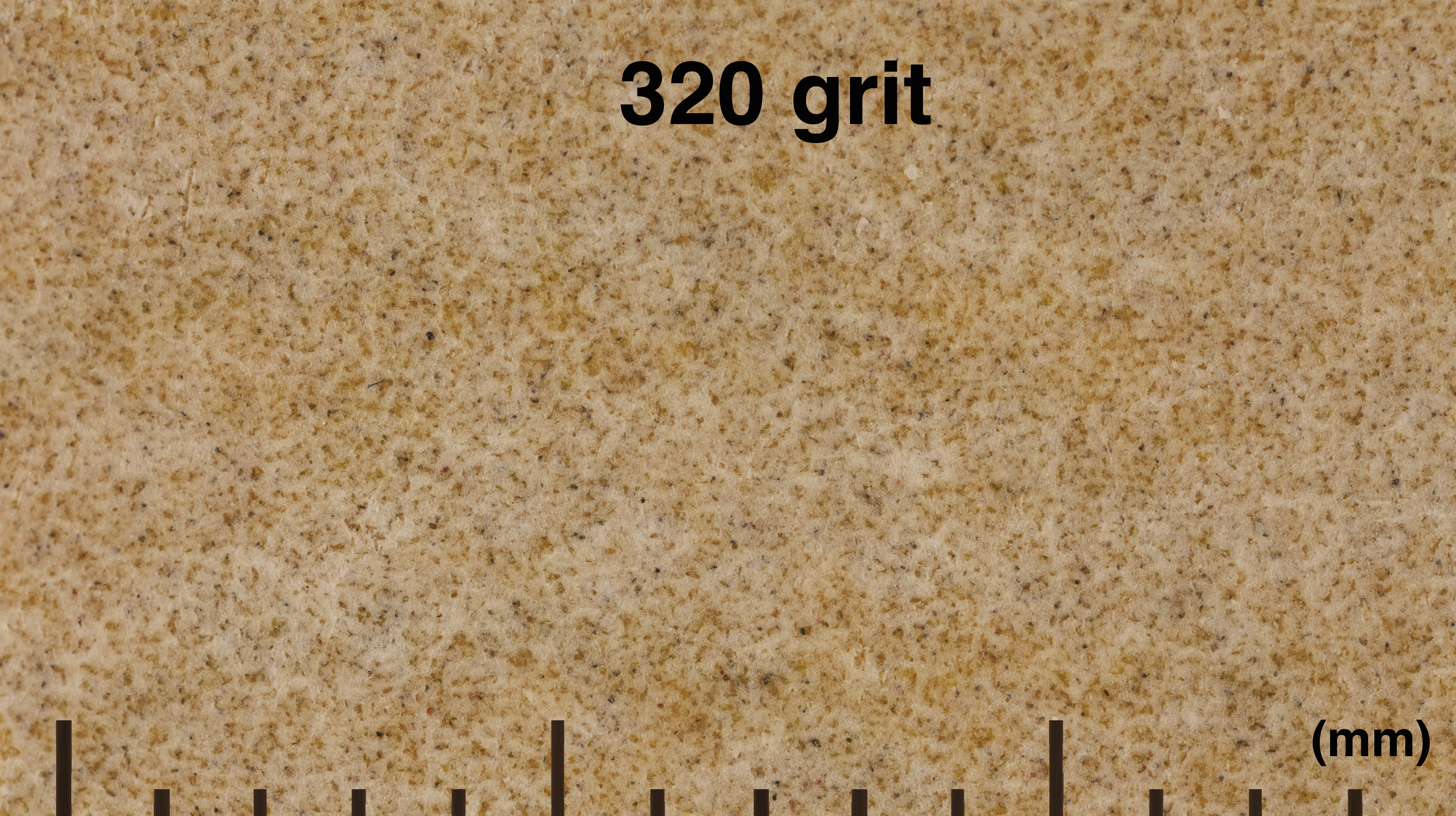
Macro photo of 320 grit sandpaper

Glue smears and drops are sometimes present around the joints of furniture. They can be removed using a combination of scraping, scrubbing and sanding. These approaches remove surface glue, but not the glue beneath the wood surface. Sub-surface glue will reduce the absorption of stain by wood, and may alter the scratch pattern created by sanding. Both these effects will influence the way in which the wood colours when stains are used to finish the wood. To overcome this problem it may be necessary to locally stain and touch-up areas previously covered by glue to ensure that the finish on such areas matches that of the surrounding wood.

== Bleaching and removal of stains ==
Wood surfaces are occasionally affected by various organic and inorganic stains. Sometimes such stains enhance the colour and appearance of wood. For example, oak wood affected by the beef-steak fungus has a deep rich, attractive, brown colour and there is no reason to remove the stain from the wood prior to finishing. The same applies to spalted wood whose attractive appearance is caused by fungi living in the wood prior to drying. Some fungal stains and others caused by the reaction of iron with wood can stain wood. These stains can be removed from wood using bleach. Bleaches are also occasionally used to reduce the difference in colour between lighter sapwood and darker heartwood and also colour variations within heartwood. Such bleaching can make it easier to achieve a uniformly coloured wood when the wood is subsequently coloured with pigmented stains and dyes (see below). Furthermore, the natural colours of wood may lighten or darken when wood is exposed to sunlight. Permanent colours can be created by bleaching wood to remove its natural colour and then re-colouring the wood using artificial, light-fast, stains.

The bleaches used to remove unwanted fungal stains from wood include two-part peroxide bleach and solutions of sodium hypochlorite. The former is particularly effective at removing the natural colour of wood before it is coloured with pigmented stains or dyes. Oxalic acid is particularly effective at removing iron stains from wood.

== Colouring wood ==
Wood can be stained to change its colour or left unstained before application of lacquer, or other types of top-coats. Staining should enhance the appearance of wood by reducing colour variation between and within sapwood and heartwood. It also provides a way of giving bland looking woods such as poplar the appearance of prized furniture woods such as ebony, mahogany or walnut. Wood can be stained using dyes or pigmented finishes. These finishes are available in a wide variety of colours, many of which are not part of the natural colour palette of wood, for example, blues and greens. Pigmented stains tend to highlight the grain (and also sanding scratches), whereas dyes do not have this effect and are more transparent. Wood can also be coloured by exposing it to chemicals that react with the wood to form coloured compounds. Chemical staining of wood is rarely carried out because it is easier to colour wood using dye or pigmented stain, however, ammonia fuming is a chemical staining method that is still occasionally used to darken woods such as oak that contain a lot of tannins. Staining of wood is difficult to control because some parts of the wood absorb more stain than others, which leads to problems such as blotchiness and streaking. For this reason, as pointed out by Flexner, many people prefer to omit the staining step when finishing wood.

== Basic wood finishing procedure ==
Wood finishing starts with sanding either by hand, typically using a sanding block or power sander, scraping, or planing. Imperfections or nail holes on the surface may be filled using wood putty or pores may be filled using wood filler. Often, the wood's color is changed by staining, bleaching, or any of a number of other techniques.

Once the wood surface is prepared and stained, the finish is applied. It usually consists of several coats of wax, shellac, drying oil, lacquer, varnish, or paint, and each coat is typically followed by sanding.

Finally, the surface may be polished or buffed using steel wool, pumice, rotten stone or other materials, depending on the shine desired. Often, a final coat of wax is applied over the finish to add a degree of protection.

French polishing is a finishing method of applying many thin coats of shellac using a rubbing pad, yielding a very fine glossy finish.

Ammonia fuming is a traditional process for darkening and enriching the color of white oak. Ammonia fumes react with the natural tannins in the wood and cause it to change colours. The resulting product is known as "fumed oak".

== Comparison of different clear finishes ==
Clear finishes are intended to make wood look good and meet the demands to be placed on the finish. Choosing a clear finish for wood involves trade-offs between appearance, protection, durability, safety, requirements for cleaning, and ease of application. The following table compares the characteristics of different clear finishes. 'Rubbing qualities' indicates the ease with which a finish can be manipulated to deliver the finish desired. Shellac should be considered in two different ways. It is used thinned with denatured alcohol as a finish and as a way to manipulate the wood's ability to absorb other finishes. The alcohol evaporates almost immediately to yield a finish that will adhere to virtually any surface, even glass, and virtually any other finish can be used over it.

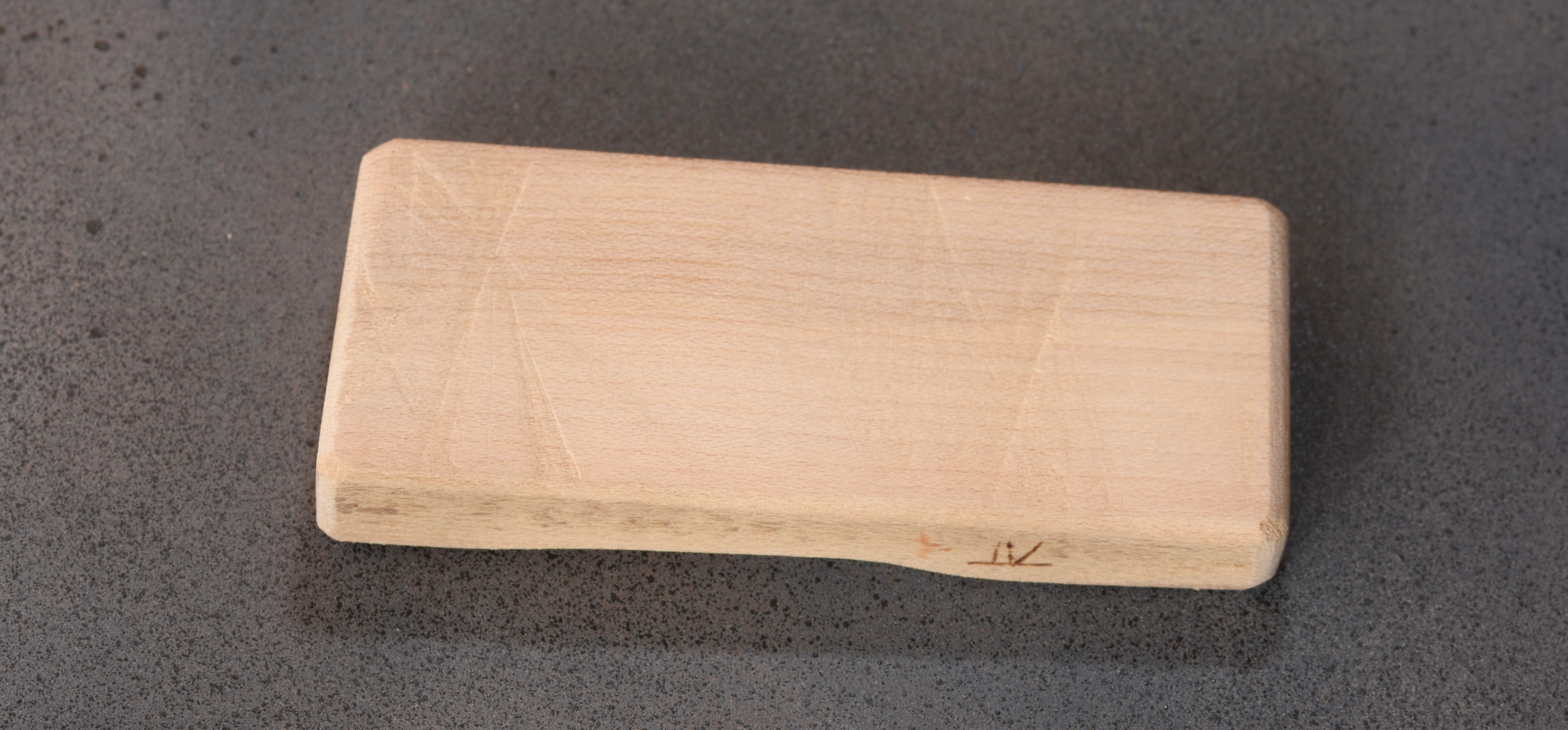
No finish

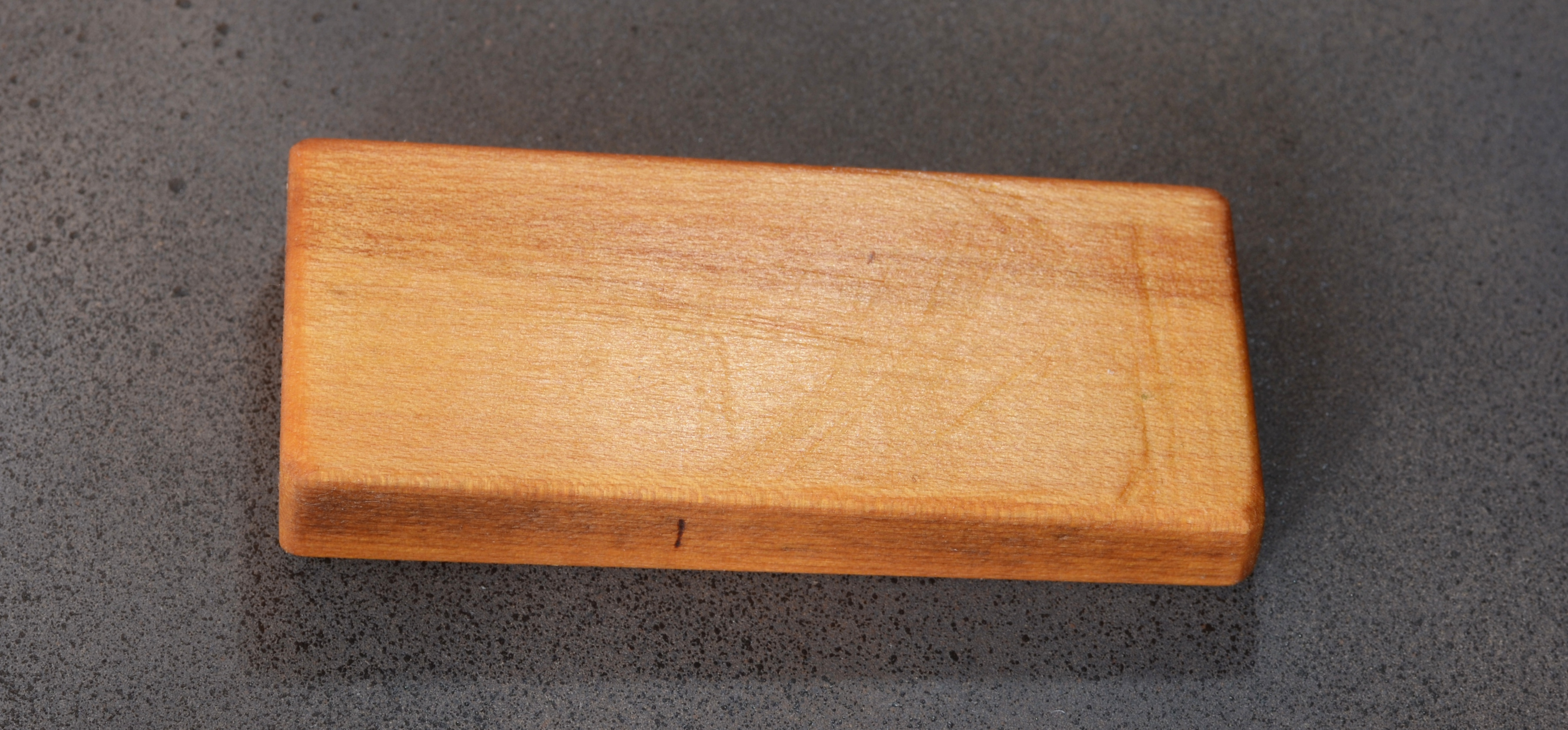
Linseed oil

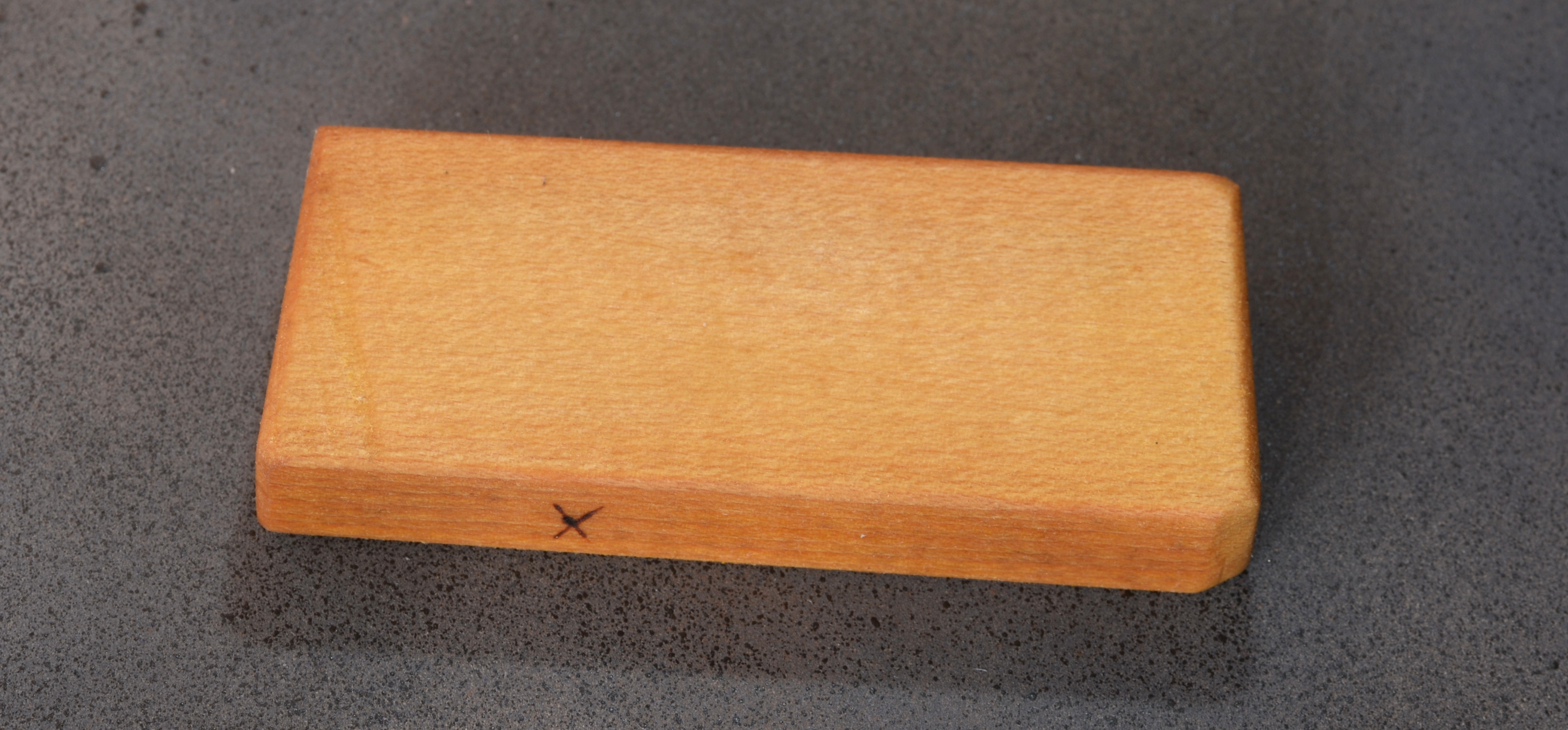
Tung oil

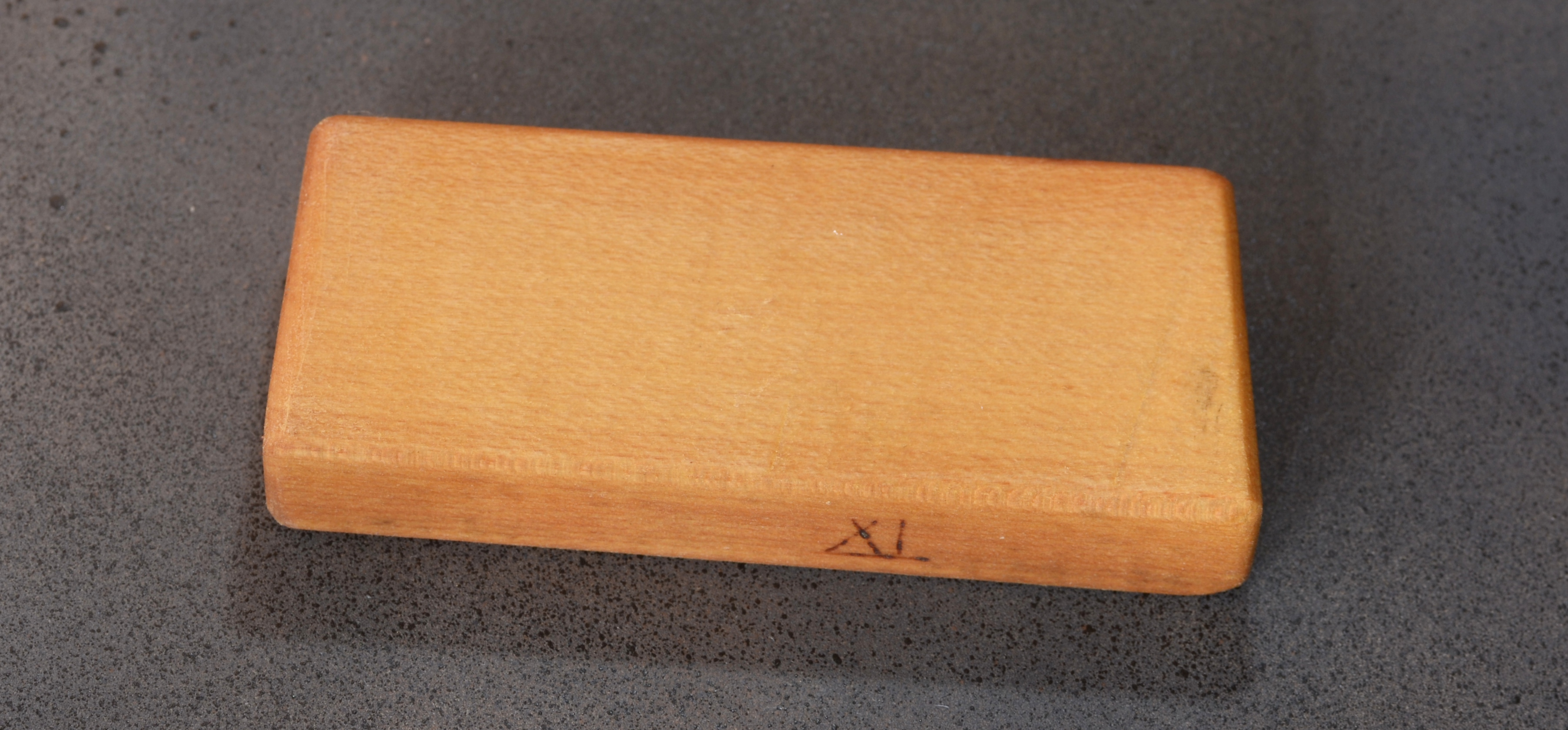
Tung oil and linseed oil

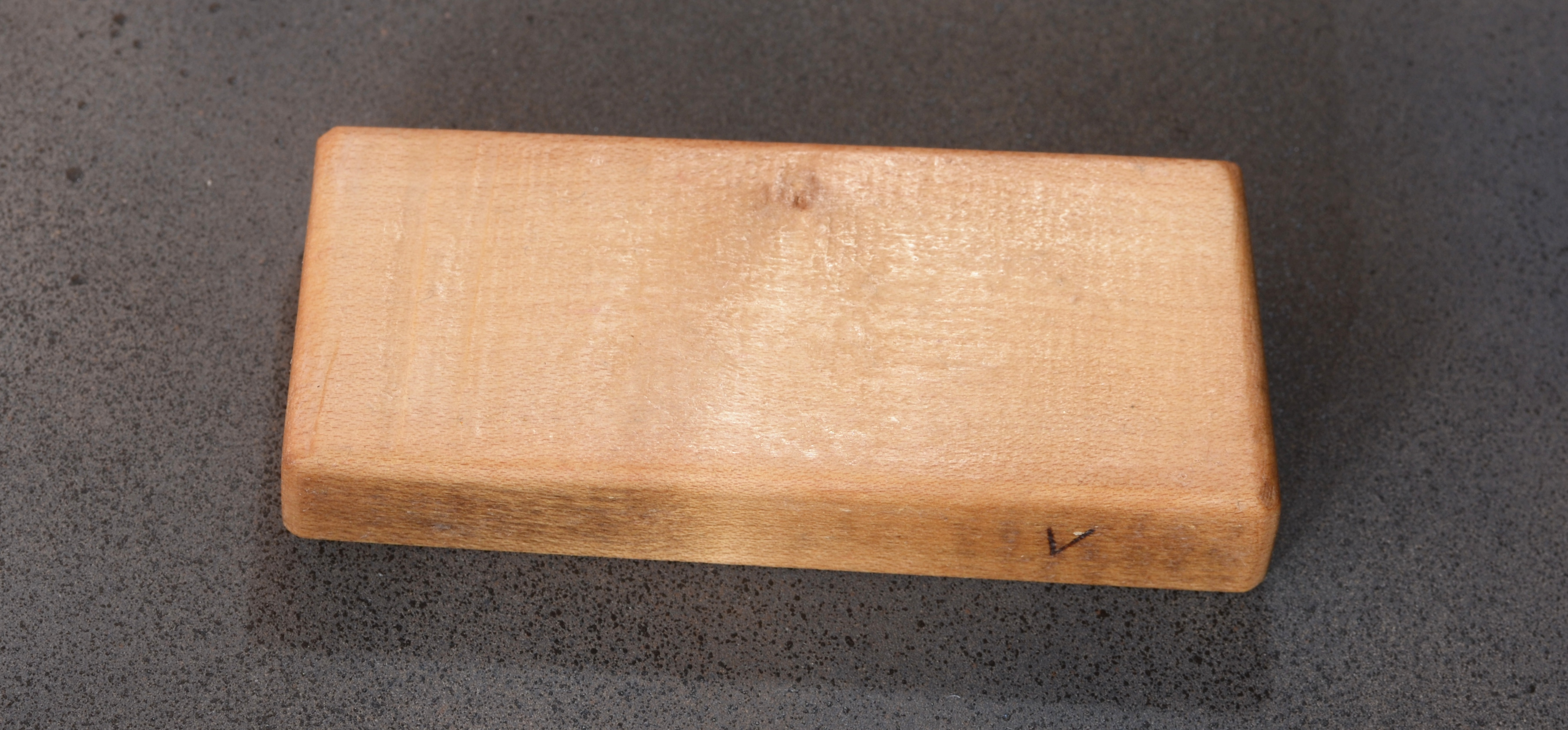
Molten bee wax

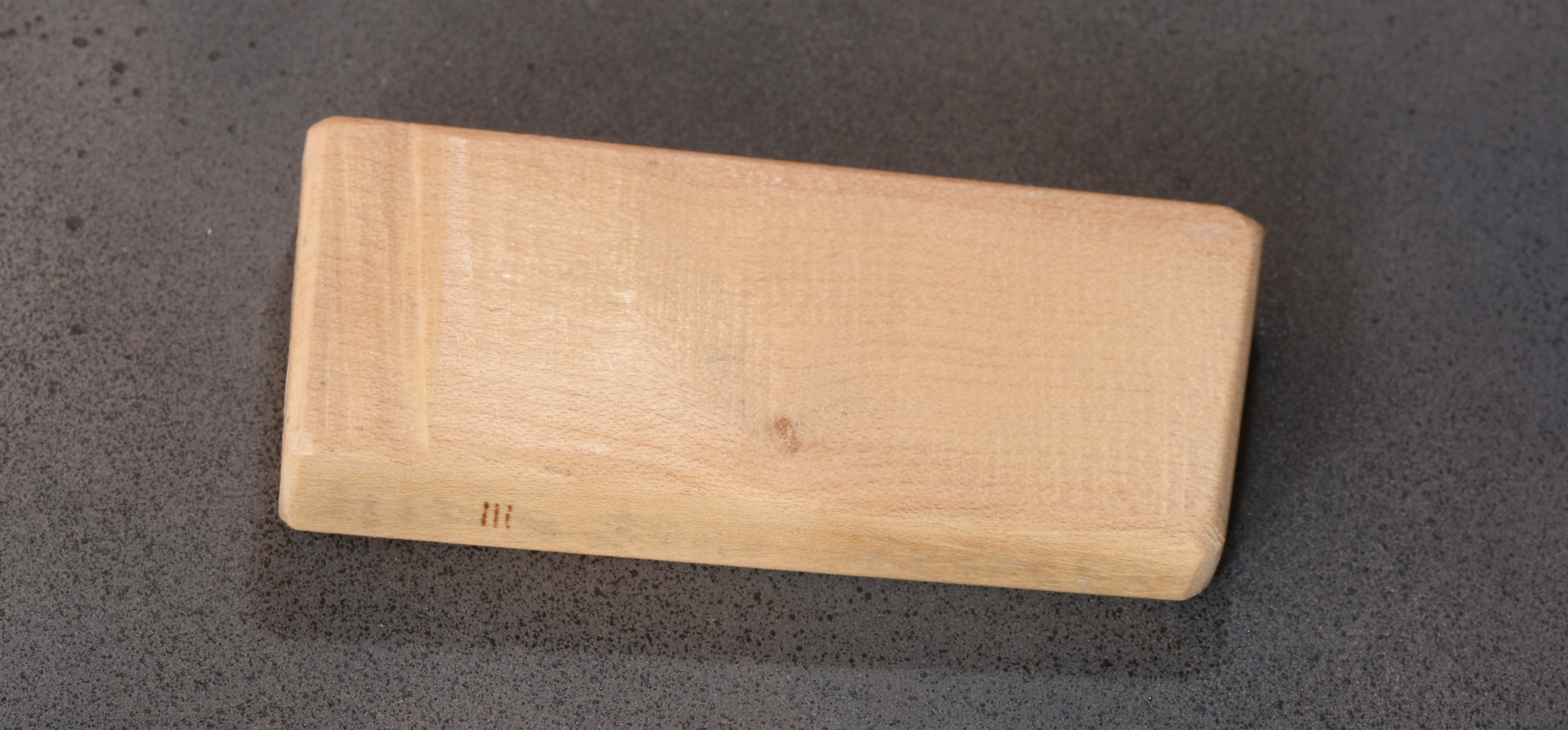
2:1 ratio of beeswax and carnauba wax

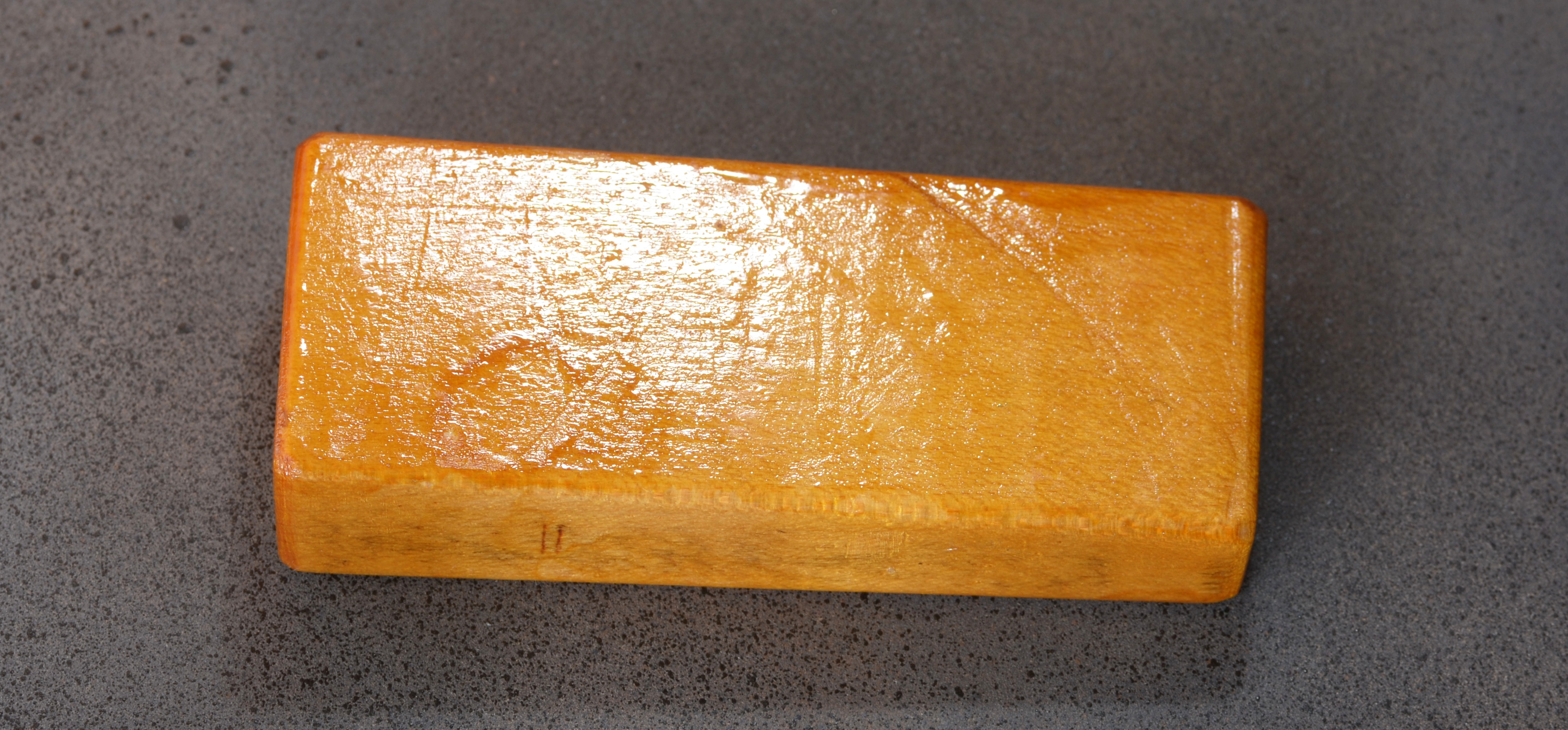
Shellac

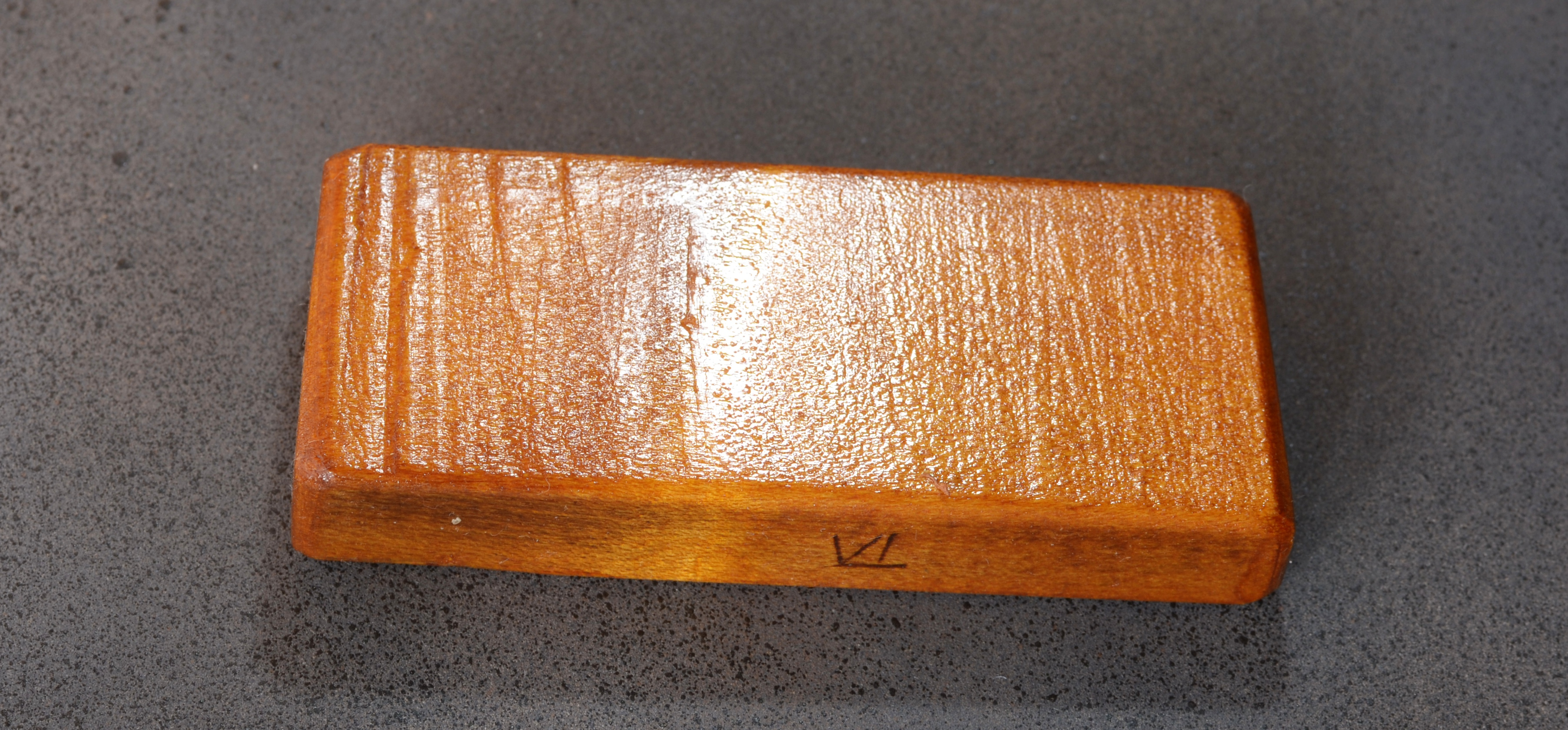
Shellac and linseed oil

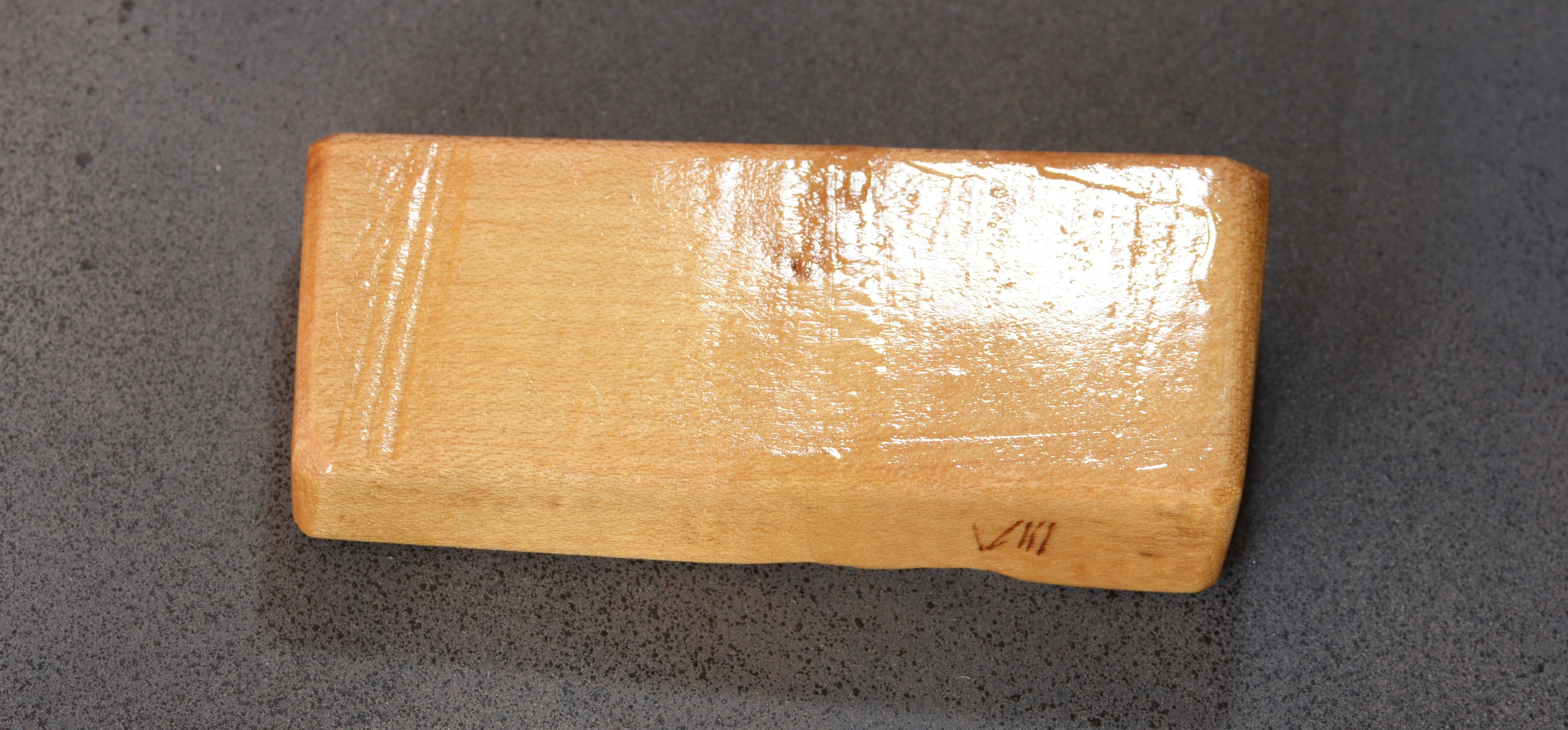
Alkyd varnish

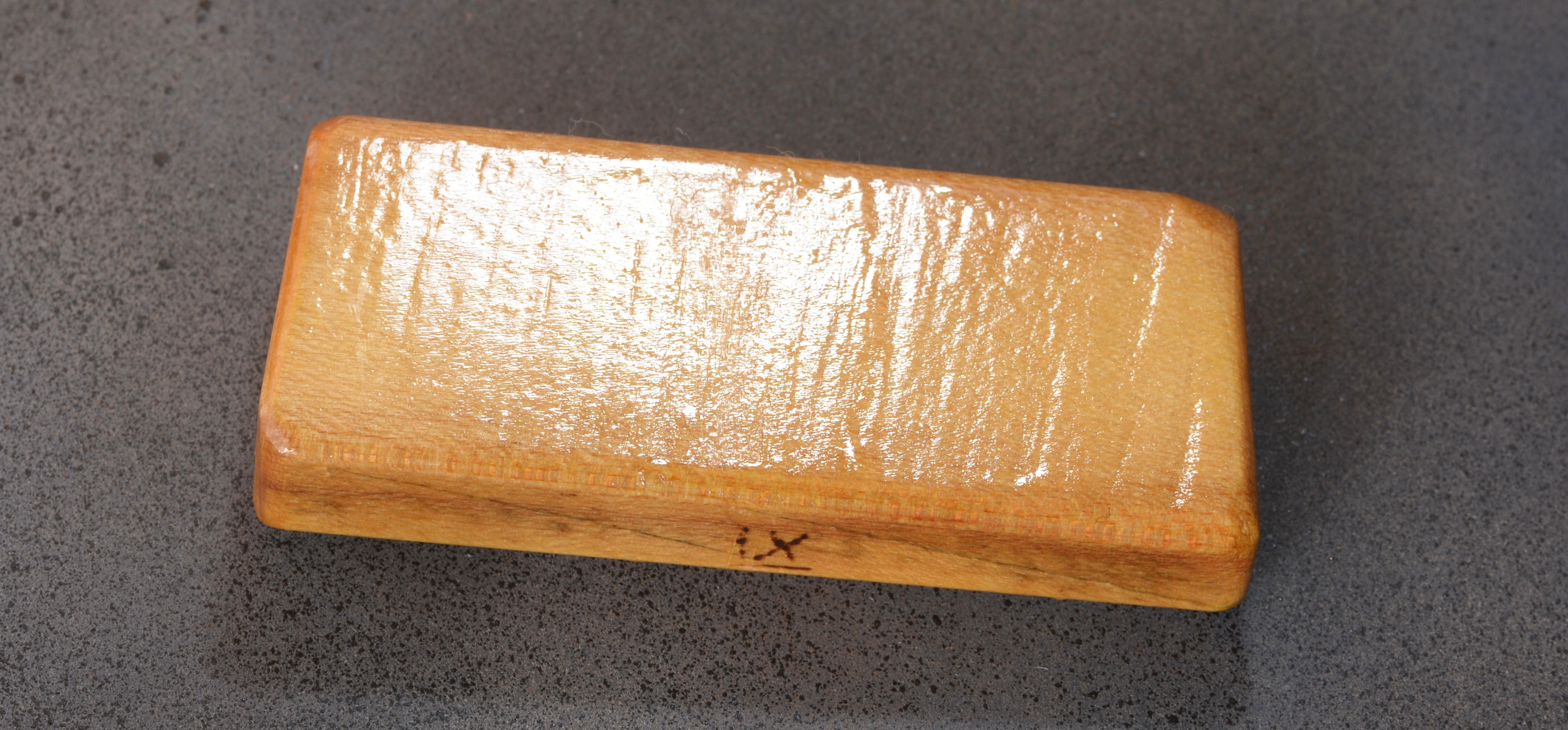
Spar or yacht varnish

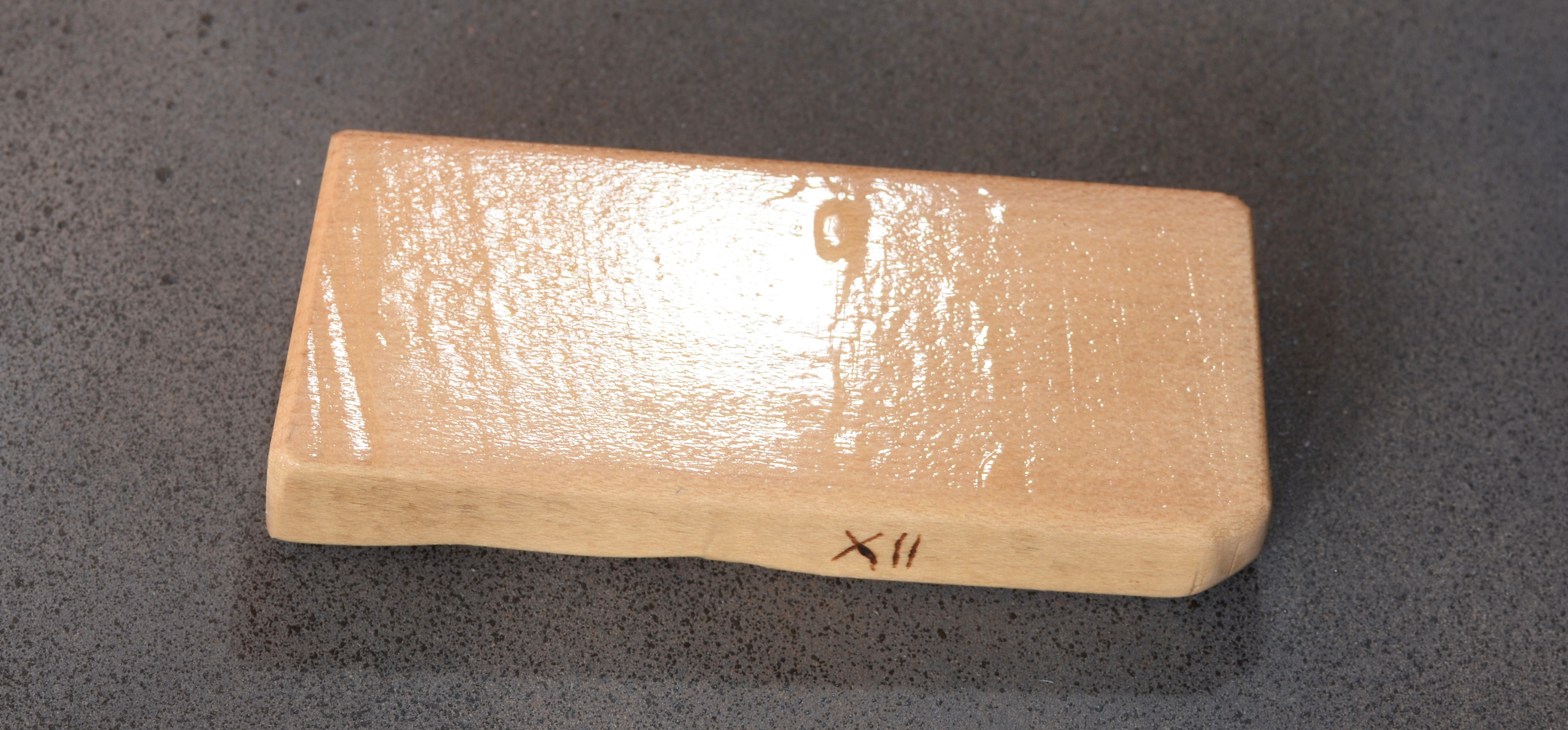
Acrylic varnish

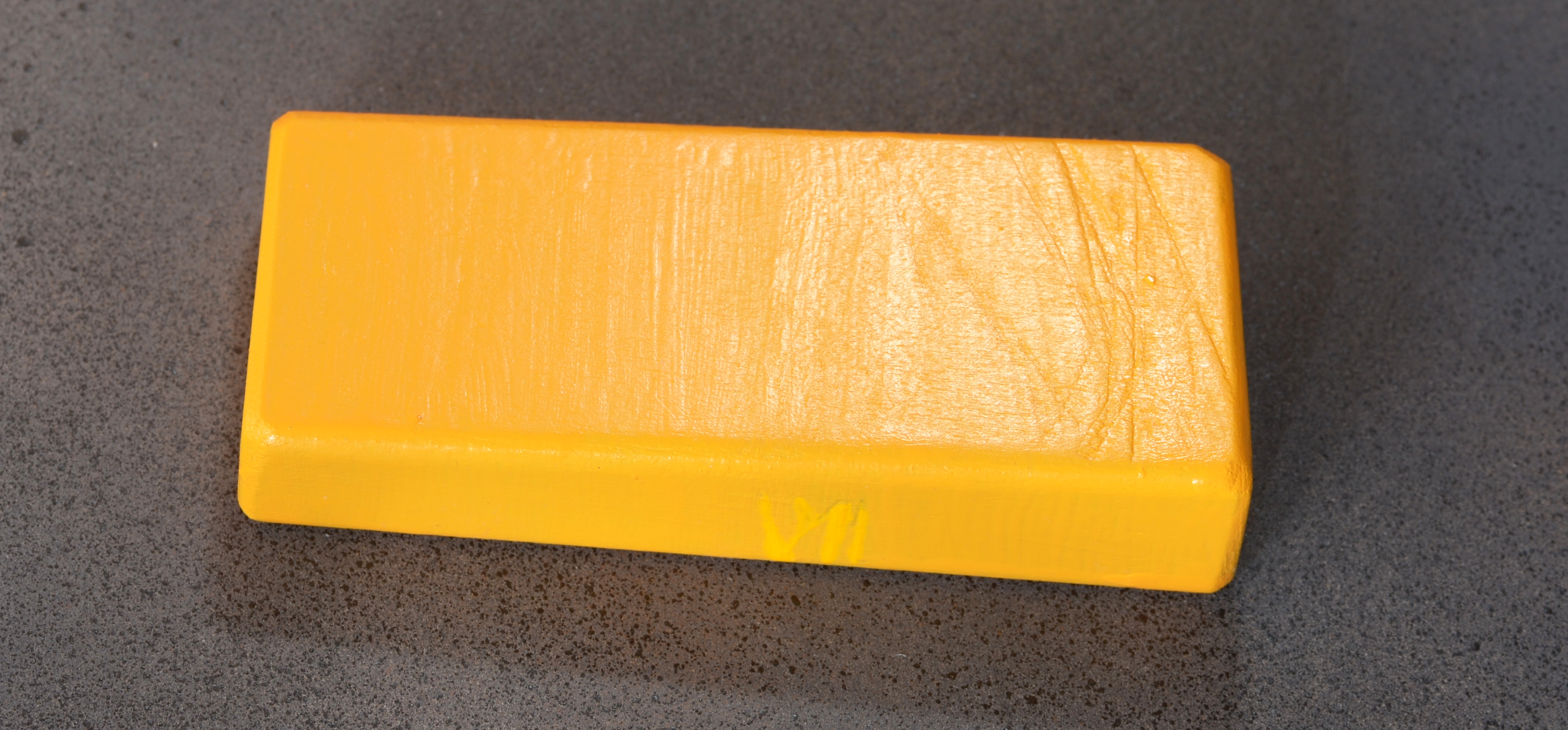
Acrylic paint

	Appearance	Protection	Durability	Safety	Ease of application	Reversibility	Rubbing qualities
Wax	Dull, even sheen unless buffed or polished	Low, short term	Requires frequent reapplication	Safe when solvents in paste wax evaporate	Easy. Applied with cloth or brush and worked into wood, excess left to cure before buffing with a cloth for desired level of sheen.	Difficult. Solvents thin wax causing it to penetrate deeper. Sanding creates heat. Scraping recommended	Matte to satin finish, can to be buffed to a sheen.
Hardwax oil	Matte to Satin sheen.	Moderate protection and water resistance.	Moderate durability once cured. May require periodic reapplication.	Safe when low VOC solvents evaporate.	Easy. Applied in very thin coats with cloth, pad, roller or brush.	Difficult. Solvents thin wax causing it to penetrate deeper. Sanding creates heat. Scraping recommended	matte to satin finish, can be buffed to a sheen.
Shellac	From virtually clear (super blond) to a rich orange (garnet)	Fair against water, poor solvent protection	Moderate.	Safe when solvent evaporates, used as food and pill coating	Clogs spray equipment. Quick solvent flash time makes brushing difficult. Ox or badger/skunk hair brush recommended. Easy to pad, however French Polish is difficult	Completely reversible using alcohol	Excellent
Nitrocellulose lacquer	Transparent, satin and gloss	Reasonable protection	Soft and somewhat durable	Uses toxic solvents. Good protection is needed, especially if painted	Moderate. Available in cans, large scale requires spray equipment. No sanding required between coats.	Reversible with proper solvents	Excellent soft finish
Pre-Cat lacquer	Transparent, all sheens from 5% to 90%	Good general protection against wet and dry heat.	Meets UK and European standards for "general use".	Uses toxic solvents. Spray booth is needed.	Moderate. Requires spray equipment. No sanding required between coats.	Non-Reversible after 5 days	Excellent general furniture finish, harder than standard lacquer.
Conversion varnish or Acid-Cat Lacquer	Transparent, all sheens from 5% to Gloss	Excellent protection against many substances	Meets UK and European standards for "severe use".	Used to use toxic solvents, including toluene.Today available water based, with less toxic solvents.	Moderate. Requires spray equipment. Used primarily in professional shops. No sanding required between coats.	Difficult to reverse	Excellent hard finish
Boiled linseed oil	Yellow warm glow, pops grain^{1}, darkens with age	Low	Low	Relatively safe once cured, metallic driers are poisonous.	Easy. Applied in thin coats with cloth or brush, excess wiped off. Cure time can be long.	Difficult. All saturated wood needs to be removed (planing/sanding/scraping)	Cures matte
Tung oil	Warm glow, pops grain^{1}, lighter than linseed	Low, but has water resistance	Low	Relatively safe when fully cured. Pure tung oil contains no metallic dryers. Many products labeled tung oil are oil/varnish blends	Moderate. Applied in thin coats with cloth or brush, excess is wiped off. First coat is typically thinned down. Partial cure is necessary as very long finishing schedule for sufficient amount of coats.	Difficult. All saturated wood needs to be removed (planing/sanding/scraping)	Cures hard and matte, can be buffed to a satin sheen.
Alkyd varnish	Not as transparent as lacquer, yellowish/orange tint, pops grain.	Good protection, also available with UV resistance	Durable	Relatively safe once VOCs evaporate, uses petroleum based solvents	Moderate. Brush, roll or spray. Brushing needs good technique to avoid bubbles and streaks.	Can be stripped using paint removers	Cures hard yet flexible, gloss or satin finish.
Polyurethane oil based varnish	Slight ambering, comes in a variety of sheen	Excellent protection against many substances, tough finish	Durable after approx. 7 day curing period	Relatively safe once VOCs evaporate, uses petroleum based solvents	Moderate. Applied in coats with brush, roller or sprayer. Medium curing times, sanding required between coats. Easy when thinned and wiped on.	Can be stripped using paint removers	Cures hard. Easy to rub out with steel wool or synthetic pads to reduce sheen, or buffed to a high gloss.
Polyurethane water-based varnish	Transparent or paints, all sheens from 1% to 80%	Excellent protection. Newer products (2009) also UV stable when noted	Durable after a two-day curing period	Safer than oil-based polyurethane, fewer volatile organic compounds	Easy. Applied with brush, roller or sprayer. Fast drying demands care in application technique to avoid bubbles and streaks. Sanding required between coats.	Can be stripped using paint removers	Excellent. It finishes hard and can be buffed to a gloss. Use a release agent. A thick finish can leave a plastic feel.
2-Part polyurethane	Transparent	Stronger protection than regular polyurethane varnish	Durable once cured, generally less than an hour	low or free of VOCs, nonreactive when cured	generally sprayed, equipment must be cleaned of any mixed product immediately	Irreversible	Sands easily. Sanding not needed between coats
Oil-varnish blends (i.e. Danish oil, Teak oil, "Tung oil finish")	Enhances natural figure like a drying oil, but more protective and faster drying.	Low, but more than pure oil finishes.	Fairly durable, but may require periodic reapplication for heavy use areas such as tables and worktops.	Relatively safe once VOCs have evaporated, uses petroleum based solvents	Easy. Applied in thin coats with cloth or brush, excess wiped off. Too many applications can result in sticky build up	Difficult. All saturated wood needs to be removed (planing/sanding/scraping)	Dries hard. can be buffed to a matte finish or to a gloss. Often top coated with paste wax for extra protection
Epoxy resin	Thick, high-gloss, and transparent. Some formulations can cloud or yellow with UV exposure	High level of protection	Flexible and durable	Safe when cured	Easy pour-on application for flat surfaces, difficult to apply evenly on more complicated shapes	Cleanable with acetone when liquid. Irreversible once cured	flexibility makes sanding difficult but possible

^{1} accentuates visual properties due to differences in wood grain.

== Automated wood finishing methods ==
Manufacturers who mass-produce products implement automated flatline finish systems. These systems consist of a series of processing stations that may include sanding, dust removal, staining, sealer and topcoat applications. As the name suggests, the primary part shapes are flat. Liquid wood finishes are applied via automated spray guns in an enclosed environment or spray cabin. The material then can enter an oven or be sanded again depending on the manufacturer's setup. The material can also be recycled through the line to apply another coat of finish or continue in a system that adds successive coats depending on the layout of the production line. The systems typically used one of two approaches to production.

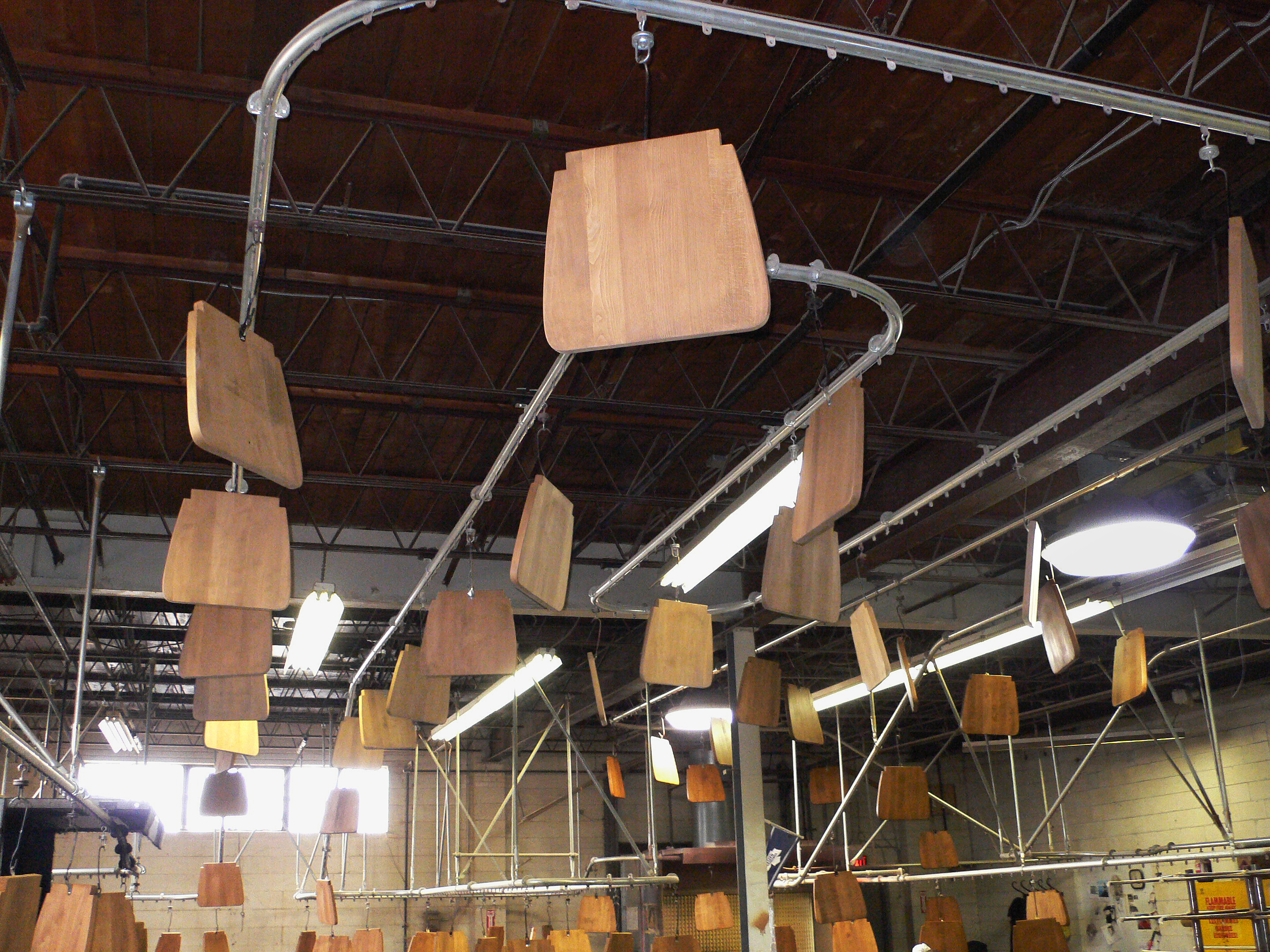
In this hangline approach, wood items being finished are moved through various finishing stages on a conveyor system

=== Hangline approach ===
In the hangline approach, wood items being finished are hung by carriers or hangers that are attached to a conveyor system that moves the items overhead or above the floor space. The conveyor itself can be ceiling mounted, wall mounted or supported by floor mounts. A simple overhead conveyor system can be designed to move wood products through several wood finishing processes in a continuous loop. The hangline approach to automated wood finishing also allows the option of moving items up to warmer air at the ceiling level to speed up drying process.

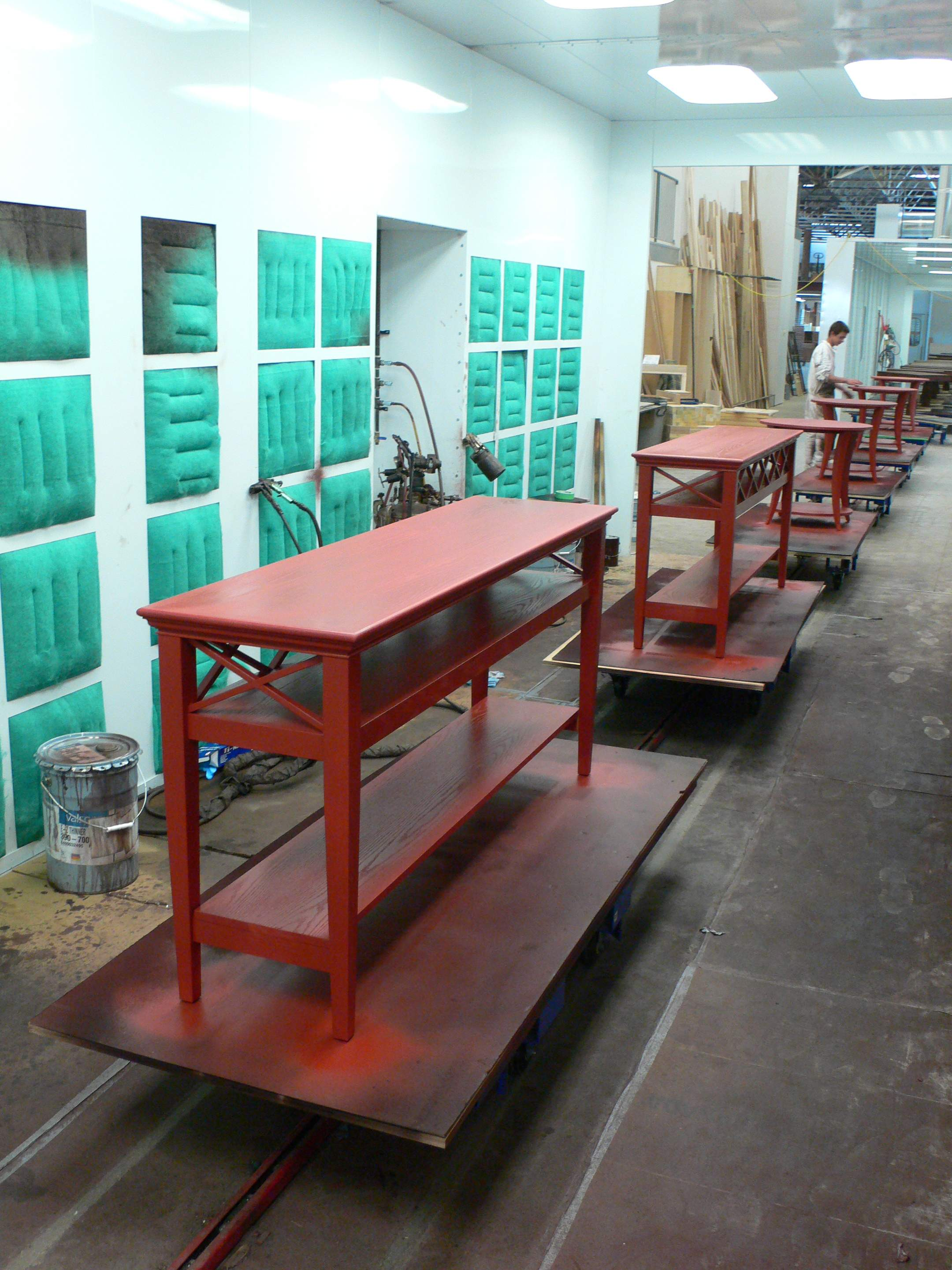
In this towline method, mobile carts move large furniture through various finishing stages on a conveyor system.

=== Towline approach ===
The towline approach to automating wood finishing uses mobile carts that are propelled by conveyors mounted in or on the floor. This approach is useful for moving large, awkward shaped wood products that are difficult or impossible to lift or hang overhead, such as four-legged wood furniture. The mobile carts used in the towline approach can be designed with top platens that rotate either manually or automatically. The rotating top platens allow the operator to have easy access to all sides of the wood item throughout the various wood finishing processes such as sanding, painting and sealing.

== See also ==
- Wood stain
- Refinishing
- Distressing
- Danish oil
- Xylotechnigraphy
