= Wood stain =

Type of wood finish used to color wood

A tin of wood stain

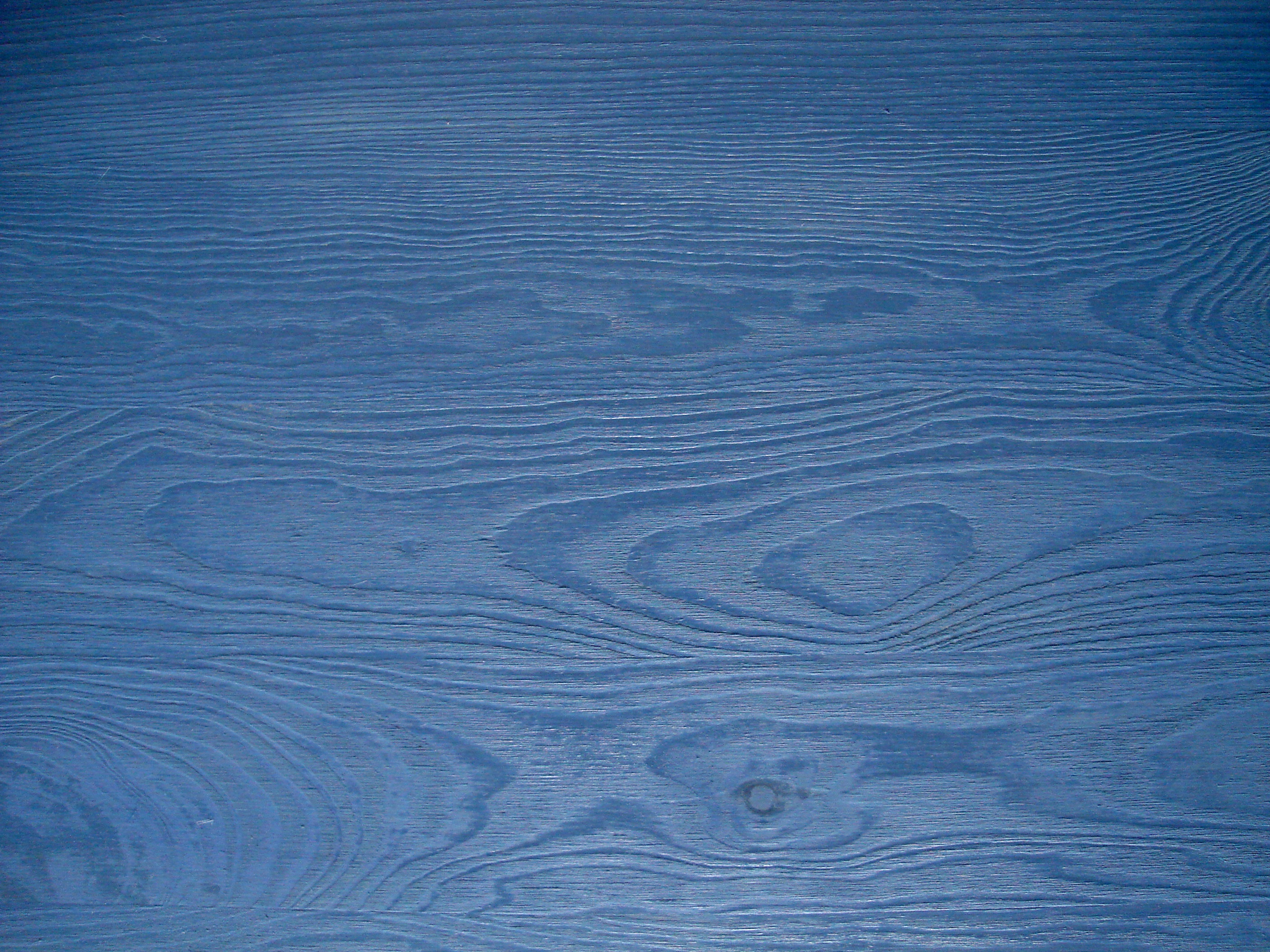
Blue-coloured wood stain

Wood stain is used in woodworking, construction, and architectural finishing to modify the color and appearance of wood while allowing the grain pattern to remain visible. Unlike paint, which forms an opaque surface coating, stains are typically formulated to penetrate wood fibers or lightly coat the surface, enhancing natural texture rather than concealing it.

Wood stains are used for both decorative and protective purposes in interior furniture, flooring, cabinetry, and exterior structures such as siding, decks, and fences. Modern formulations may incorporate water repellents, ultraviolet stabilizers, and preservatives intended to slow weathering caused by moisture and sunlight exposure.

Stains are commonly categorized by carrier type, including oil-based, water-based, alcohol-based, and gel stains, each offering different drying characteristics, penetration behavior, and maintenance requirements.

== Description ==
Wood stain is a type of wood finishing product used to color wood. It consists of colorants dissolved and/or suspended in a vehicle or solvent. Vehicle is the preferred term, as the contents of a stain may not be truly dissolved in the vehicle, but rather suspended, and thus the vehicle may not be a true solvent. The vehicle often may be water, alcohol, a petroleum distillate, or a finishing agent such as shellac, lacquer, varnish and polyurethane. Depending on the formulation, wood stains may either penetrate the wood fibers or remain near the surface. Penetrating stains are commonly used for exterior applications because they allow moisture vapor transmission while reducing surface film failure.

== History ==
The practice of altering the color of wood predates modern finishing materials and has been documented in ancient woodworking traditions. Early wood coloration methods relied on naturally occurring substances such as plant extracts, oils, tannins, and mineral pigments to darken or modify the appearance of timber while preserving visible grain patterns. Iron salts, vinegar solutions, and natural dyes were historically used to react chemically with wood fibers, particularly in tannin-rich species such as oak.

During the eighteenth and nineteenth centuries, advances in chemistry and industrial manufacturing led to the development of commercially prepared wood stains based on drying oils and alcohol-soluble dyes. These products allowed more consistent coloration and became widely used in furniture production and architectural woodworking during the Industrial Revolution. The introduction of synthetic aniline dyes in the late nineteenth century further expanded available color ranges and improved uniformity in manufactured finishes.

Twentieth-century developments in coatings technology introduced pigment-based penetrating stains formulated with petroleum-derived solvents, improving durability for exterior applications such as siding and decking. Later innovations included gel stains and water-borne formulations designed to improve application control and reduce emissions of volatile organic compounds (VOCs). Environmental regulations adopted in many countries beginning in the late twentieth century encouraged the development of lower-VOC and water-based stain systems while maintaining protective and decorative performance.

== Composition ==
Stain is composed of the same three primary ingredients as paint (pigment, solvent (or vehicle), and binder), but is predominantly vehicle, then pigment and/or dye, and lastly a small amount of binder. Much like the dyeing or staining of fabric, wood stain is designed to add color to the substrate (wood and other materials) while leaving some of the substrate still visible. Transparent varnishes or surface films are applied afterwards. In principle, stains do not provide a durable surface coating or film. However, because the binders are from the same class of film-forming binders that are used in paints and varnishes, some build-up of film occurs.

Many exterior wood stains also include water-repellent additives, ultraviolet absorbers, and mildewcides intended to slow weathering caused by sunlight and moisture exposure.

== Colorants ==
Pigments and/or dyes are largely used as colorants in most stains. The difference between the two is in the solubility and in the size of the particles. While dyes are molecules that dissolve into the vehicle, pigments are larger than molecules and are temporarily suspended in the vehicle, usually settling out over time. Stains with primarily dye content are said to be 'transparent', while stains with more pigment in them are said to be 'solid' (opaque); some stains may be called 'semi-solid' or 'semi-transparent', and these may be interchangeable terms, and the relative transparency or opaqueness may fall somewhere between the two extremes.

Typically, dyes will color very fine-grained woods (such as cherry or maple) while pigments will not color woods such as these as well. Fine-grained woods generally have pores that are too small for the pigments to settle into. As a result, usually pigment-containing stains will also include a small amount of a 'binder' which helps to adhere the pigments to the wood. A common binder would be a drying oil such as linseed oil.

Most commercial stains contain both dyes and pigments, though often in varying colors and ratios (to each other) depending on the desired coloring effect. Additionally, to some extent, the degree to which a stain will color a particular wood may be dependent on the length of time it is left on the wood, with longer exposure times accomplishing deeper coloration. Typically, a 'transparent' stain will accentuate the wood grain (as it is transparent), while a more 'solid' stain will tend to obscure the wood grain (as it is more opaque, akin to what we would usually call 'paint'). Pigments, regardless of the suspension agent, will not give much color to very dense woods, but will deeply color woods with large pores (e.g., pine).

== Comparison with paint and varnish ==
The initial application of any paint or varnish is similarly absorbed into the substrate, but because stains contain lower amounts of binder, the binder from a stain resides mainly below the surface while the pigment remains near the top or at the surface. Stains that employ metallic pigments such as iron oxides usually are more opaque; first because metallic pigments are opaque by nature, but also because the particles of which they consist are much larger than organic pigments and therefore do not penetrate as well.

Most wood stains for interior uses (e.g., floors and furniture) require a secondary application of varnish or finish for longer-term protection of the wood, and also to adjust for matte or gloss effects. Stains are differentiated from varnishes in that the latter usually has no significant added color or pigment and is designed primarily to form a protective surface film. Some products are marketed as a combination of stain and varnish.

Unlike film-forming coatings such as paint or varnish, penetrating stains typically weather gradually rather than peel, allowing maintenance through cleaning and reapplication rather than full coating removal.

== Comparison of oil-based and water-based stains ==
Wood stains are commonly categorized as either oil-based or water-based according to the primary carrier used to transport pigments and binders into the wood surface.

Oil-based stains typically use mineral spirits or similar petroleum-derived solvents as a carrier. These formulations generally penetrate wood fibers more slowly, allowing extended working time and facilitating absorption into porous wood surfaces. Oil-based stains are frequently used in exterior applications because penetration into the wood can reduce surface film formation and allow coatings to weather gradually rather than peel or crack.

Water-based stains use water as the primary carrier and typically dry more rapidly than oil-based products. Faster drying times can reduce application time and odor during use, and tools may often be cleaned using water rather than solvents. Modern water-based formulations may also include acrylic or urethane binders designed to improve durability and color retention.

Performance differences between oil-based and water-based stains depend on factors including wood species, moisture content, climate exposure, and surface preparation. Exterior durability is influenced not only by the carrier system but also by additives such as ultraviolet absorbers, water repellents, and mildewcides incorporated into the formulation.

Both types of stain are used for decorative and protective purposes, and selection is typically based on application requirements, environmental conditions, drying time preferences, and regulatory considerations such as volatile organic compound (VOC) limits.

== High viscosity stains ==
Siding stain is one variety of wood stain with very high viscosity (others can be quite thin). Effectively, siding stains are paints that do not cover as well and do not form a hard film. They are designed to penetrate better and contain binders that are softer and more flexible, allowing them to last longer than harder, more brittle paints. Siding stain protects against solar radiation, especially UV radiation, water, fungus, including mildew, and insects. Different siding stains are distinguished by the appearance they impart to wood. Certain solvent-based or oil-based siding stains contain small amounts of paraffin wax, which cannot be painted over, although re-staining is still possible.

Gel stains are a late-20th-century innovation in stain manufacturing because they are high-viscosity liquids and do not 'flow'. This property allows more control during application, particularly when the wood is in a vertical position, which can often cause traditional liquid stains to run, drip, or pool. Gel stains often have limited penetrating ability, as they are thixotropic (a liquid that nevertheless does not flow).

== Absorption ==
Applying stains can be very easy or very difficult depending on the type of substrate, type of stain, and the ambient conditions. Fresh, "green" lumber accepts stain poorly, while aged wood absorbs stains relatively well. Porosity of wood can vary greatly, even within the same piece of wood. End grain and bias-cut grain are far more absorbent, thus they will accept more pigment and will darken considerably in those areas. The hard ring may absorb differently from the soft ring.

The characteristic medullary rays in oak will absorb much less and remain mostly blonde. Woods that have been heavily subjected to paint strippers or washed down with detergents or solvents will have an increased open grain and accept substantially more stain than normal. Woods from different species of trees can have huge variations in how well they take stain. Different wood species stain differently—the overall color and shade are a result of a combination of the stain and properties of the wood. For example, although medium-to-dark stains tend to look blotchy on maple, they get deeper and more glowing on cherry, with a more consistent coloration.

Stains that are fast drying will be difficult to apply in hot weather or in direct sunlight. Stains that are slow-drying will be difficult to work with in damp and cold conditions due to a greatly lengthened evaporation and curing period. New lumber, such as pine, can have waxlike sealants put on at the mill that will prevent proper staining; stripping or sanding the surface may be required. White stains composed of metal oxides, namely titanium dioxide and zinc oxide, do not penetrate well and remain on the surface. In such cases, wear easily reveals unstained wood. They are also fairly opaque.

== Preparation ==
Thorough preparation of the wood surface, commonly through sanding, is typically necessary to promote uniform absorption of stain and achieve an even appearance. Sanding removes surface contamination and machining marks while creating a consistent texture that allows colorants to be absorbed more evenly across the wood. Progressive sanding through increasingly finer abrasive grits is generally recommended to reduce visible scratches that may become accentuated after staining.

Excessively fine sanding, however, may burnish or compact the wood surface, particularly in dense hardwoods, which can reduce stain penetration and result in lighter coloration. The appropriate sanding method and grit selection, therefore, depend on wood species, intended finish, and desired appearance.

Prior to staining, previously finished or contaminated surfaces may require cleaning, stripping, or additional surface preparation to remove residues that could interfere with stain absorption. Proper surface preparation is applicable to both unfinished and previously finished wood surfaces to ensure consistent adhesion and coloration.

== See also ==
- Wood finishing
- Varnish
