= List of vegetable oils =

Vegetable oils are triglycerides extracted from plants. Some of these oils have been part of human culture for millennia. Edible vegetable oils are used in food, both in cooking and as supplements. Many oils, edible and otherwise, are burned as fuel, such as in oil lamps and as a substitute for petroleum-based fuels. Some of the many other uses include wood finishing, oil painting, and skin care.

== Definition ==
The term "vegetable oil" can be narrowly defined as referring only to substances that are liquid at room temperature, or broadly defined without regard to a substance's state (liquid or solid) at a given temperature. While a large majority of the entries in this list fit the narrower of these definitions, some do not qualify as vegetable oils according to all understandings of the term.

== Classification ==
Vegetable oils can be classified in several ways. For instance, by their use or by the method used to extract them. In this article, vegetable oils are grouped in common classes of use.

=== Extraction method ===
There are several types of plant oils, distinguished by the method used to extract the oil from the plant. The relevant part of the plant may be placed under pressure to extract the oil, giving an expressed (or pressed) oil. The oils included in this list are of this type. Oils may also be extracted from plants by dissolving parts of plants in water or another solvent. The solution may be separated from the plant material and concentrated, giving an extracted or leached oil. The mixture may also be separated by distilling the oil away from the plant material. Oils extracted by this latter method are called essential oils. Essential oils often have different properties and uses than pressed or leached vegetable oils. Finally, macerated oils are made by infusing parts of plants in a base oil, a process called liquid–liquid extraction.

=== Sources and Uses ===
Most, but not all vegetable oils are extracted from the fruits or seeds of plants. For instance, palm oil is extracted from palm fruits, while soybean oil is extracted from soybean seeds. Vegetable oils may also be classified by grouping oils extracted from similar plants, such as "nut oils".

Although most plants contain some oil, only the oil from certain major oil crops complemented by a few dozen minor oil crops is widely used and traded.

=== Use ===
Oils from plants are used for several different purposes. Edible vegetable oils may be used for cooking, or as food additives. Many vegetable oils, edible and otherwise, are burned as fuel, for instance as a substitute for petroleum-based fuels. Some may be also used for cosmetics, medical purposes, wood finishing, oil painting and other industrial purposes.

== Edible oils ==
=== Major oils ===
These oils make up a significant fraction of worldwide edible oil production. All are also used as fuel oils.

- Coconut oil, a cooking oil, with medical and industrial applications as well. Extracted from the kernel or meat of the fruit of the coconut palm. Common in the tropics, and unusual in composition, with medium chain fatty acids dominant.
- Corn oil, one of the principal oils sold as salad and cooking oil.
- Cottonseed oil, used as a salad and cooking oil, both domestically and industrially.
- Olive oil, used in cooking, cosmetics, soaps, and as a fuel for traditional oil lamps.
- Palm oil, the most widely produced tropical oil. Popular in West African and Brazilian cuisine. Also used to make biofuel.
- Peanut oil (Ground nut oil), a clear oil with some applications as a salad dressing, and, due to its high smoke point, especially used for frying.
- Rapeseed oil, including Canola oil, the most sold cooking oil all around the world; used as a salad and cooking oil, both domestically and industrially. Also used in fuel industry as bio-fuel.
- Safflower oil, until the 1960s used in the paint industry, now mostly as a cooking oil.
- Sesame oil, cold pressed as light cooking oil, hot pressed for a darker and stronger flavor.
- Soybean oil, produced as a byproduct of processing soy meal.
- Sunflower oil, a common cooking oil, also used to make biodiesel.

=== Nut oils ===
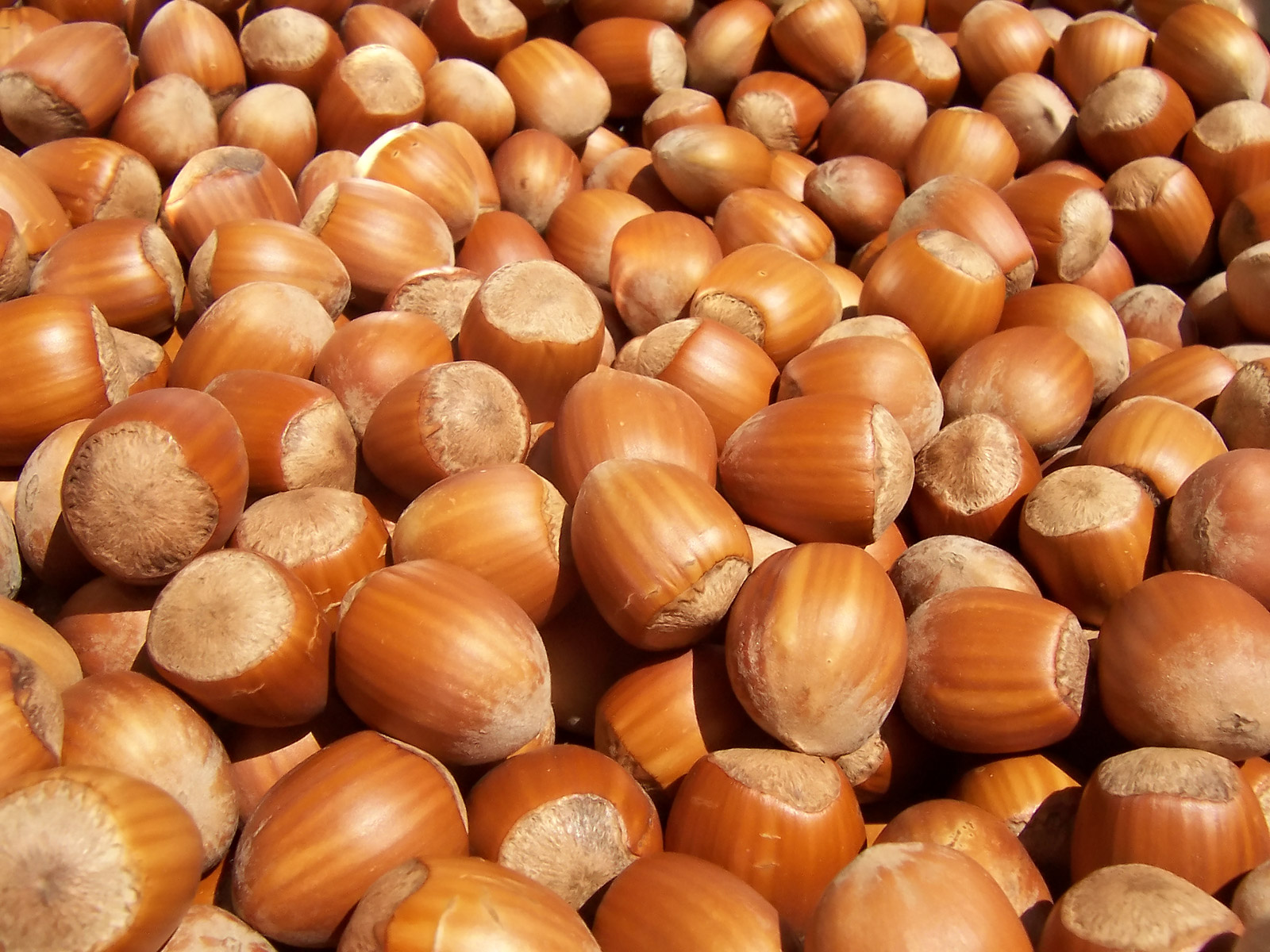
Hazelnuts from the Common Hazel, used to make hazelnut oil

Nut oils are generally used in cooking, for their flavor. Most are quite costly, because of the difficulty of extracting the oil.

- Almond oil, used as an edible oil, but primarily in the manufacture of cosmetics.
- Beech nut oil, from Fagus sylvatica nuts, is a well-regarded edible oil in Europe, used for salads and cooking.
- Brazil nut oil contains 75% unsaturated fatty acids composed mainly of oleic and linolenic acids, as well as the phytosterol, beta-sitosterol, and fat-soluble vitamin E. Extra virgin oil can be obtained during the first pressing of the nuts, possibly for use as a substitute for olive oil due to its mild, pleasant flavor.
- Cashew oil, somewhat comparable to olive oil. May have value for fighting dental cavities.
- Jamaican cobnut oil, a sweet, fine-flavored oil pressed from the seeds of Omphalea triandra in the tropical Americas. It is also reported to be used as a lubricant.
- Hazelnut oil, mainly used for its flavor. Also used in skin care, because of its slight astringent nature.
- Macadamia oil, with a mild nutty flavor and a high smoke point.
- Mongongo nut oil (or manketti oil), from the seeds of the Schinziophyton rautanenii, a tree which grows in South Africa. High in vitamin E. Also used in skin care.
- Pecan oil, valued as a food oil, but requiring fresh pecans for good quality oil.
- Pine nut oil, sold as a gourmet cooking oil, and of potential medicinal interest as an appetite suppressant.
- Pistachio oil, a strongly flavored oil with a distinctive green color.
- Walnut oil, used for its flavor, also used by Renaissance painters in oil paints.

=== Citrus oils ===
A number of citrus plants yield pressed oils. Some, such as lemon and orange oil, are used as essential oils, which is uncommon for pressed oils. (Note: Lime oil, for example, is distilled, not pressed. See Jackson, p. 131) The seeds of many if not most members of the citrus family yield usable oils.

- Grapefruit seed oil, extracted from the seeds of grapefruit (Citrus × paradisi). Grapefruit seed oil was extracted experimentally in 1930 and was shown to be suitable for making soap.
- Lemon oil, similar in fragrance to the fruit. One of a small number of cold pressed essential oils. Used as a flavoring agent and in aromatherapy.
- Orange oil, like lemon oil, cold pressed rather than distilled. Consists of 90% d-Limonene. Used as a fragrance, in cleaning products and in flavoring foods.
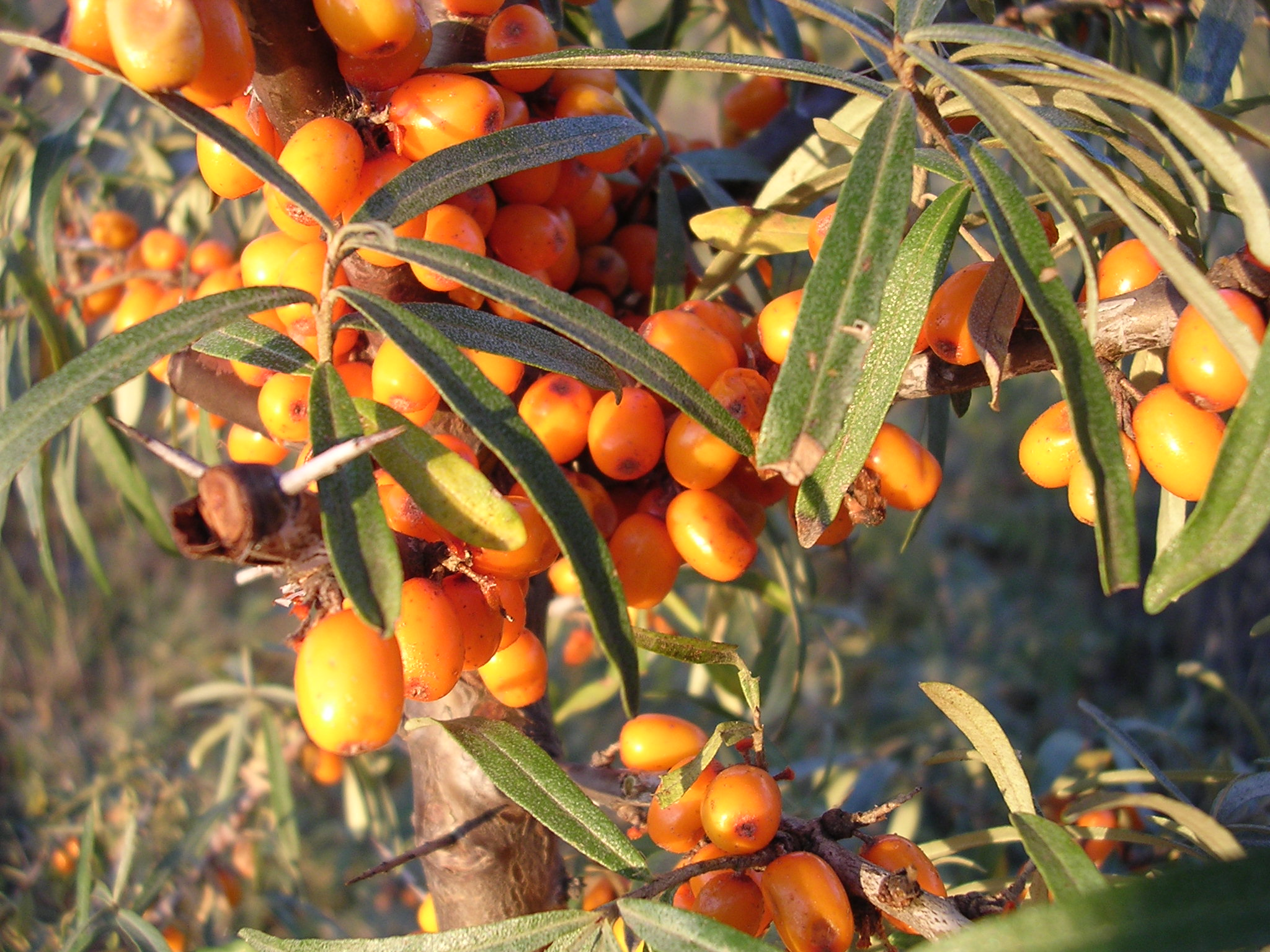
  The fruit of the sea-buckthorn

=== Oils from melon and gourd seeds ===
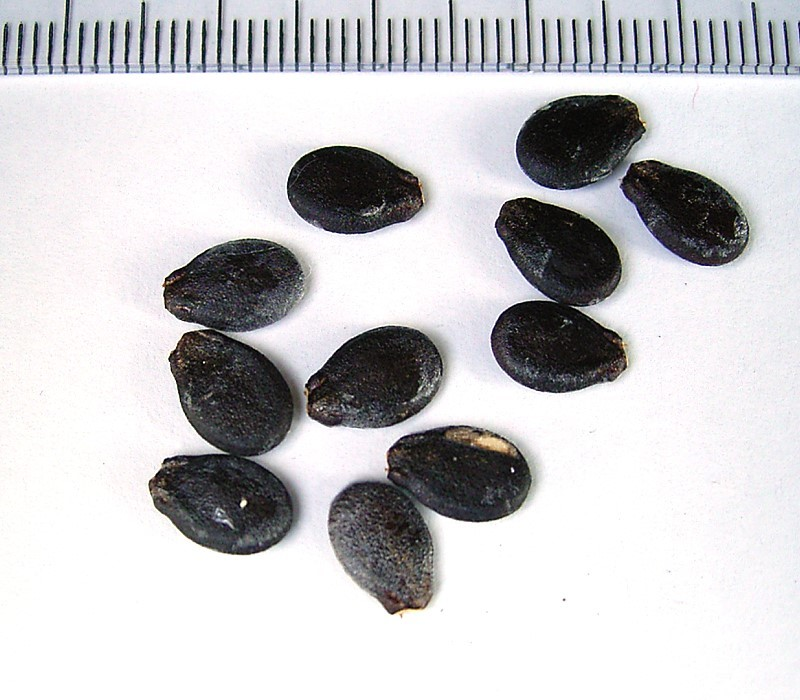
Watermelon seed oil, extracted from the seeds of Citrullus vulgaris, is used in cooking in West Africa.

Members of the Cucurbitaceae include gourds, melons, pumpkins, and squashes. Seeds from these plants are noted for their oil content, but little information is available on methods of extracting the oil. In most cases, the plants are grown as food, with dietary use of the oils as a byproduct of using the seeds as food.

- Bitter gourd oil, from the seeds of Momordica charantia. High in α-Eleostearic acid. Of current research interest for its potential anti-carcinogenic properties.
- Bottle gourd oil, extracted from the seeds of the Lagenaria siceraria, widely grown in tropical regions. Used as an edible oil.
- Buffalo gourd oil, from the seeds of the Cucurbita foetidissima, a vine with a rank odor, native to southwest North America.
- Butternut squash seed oil, from the seeds of Cucurbita moschata, has a nutty flavor that is used for salad dressings, marinades, and sautéeing.
- Egusi (Note: "Egusi" is the common name of several species of melons, including Citrullus vulgaris cultivars and Lagenaria sicerari.) seed oil, from the seeds of Melothria sphaerocarpa (syn. Cucumeropsis mannii), is particularly rich in linoleic acid.
- Pumpkin seed oil, a specialty cooking oil, produced in Austria, Slovenia and Croatia. Used mostly in salad dressings. Recent research has generated interest in pumpkin seed oil to treat certain prostate medical conditions.
- Watermelon seed oil, pressed from the seeds of Citrullus vulgaris. Traditionally used in cooking in West Africa.

=== Food supplements ===
A number of oils are used as food supplements (or "nutraceuticals"), for their nutrient content or purported medicinal effect. Borage seed oil, blackcurrant seed oil, and evening primrose oil all have a significant amount of gamma-Linolenic acid (GLA) (about 23%, 15–20% and 7–10%, respectively), and it is this that has drawn the interest of researchers.

- Açaí oil, from the fruit of several species of the Açaí palm (Euterpe) grown in the Amazon region.
- Black seed oil, pressed from Nigella sativa seeds, has a long history of medicinal use, including in ancient Greek, Asian, and Islamic medicine, as well as being a topic of current medical research.
- Blackcurrant seed oil, from the seeds of Ribes nigrum, used as a food supplement. High in gamma-Linolenic, omega-3 and omega-6 fatty acids.
- Borage seed oil, from the seeds of Borago officinalis.
- Evening primrose oil, from the seeds of Oenothera biennis, the most important plant source of gamma-Linolenic acid, particularly because it does not contain alpha-Linolenic acid.
- Flaxseed oil (called linseed oil when used as a drying oil), from the seeds of Linum usitatissimum. High in omega-3 and lignans, which can be used medicinally. A good dietary equivalent to fish oil. Easily turns rancid.

=== Other edible oils ===
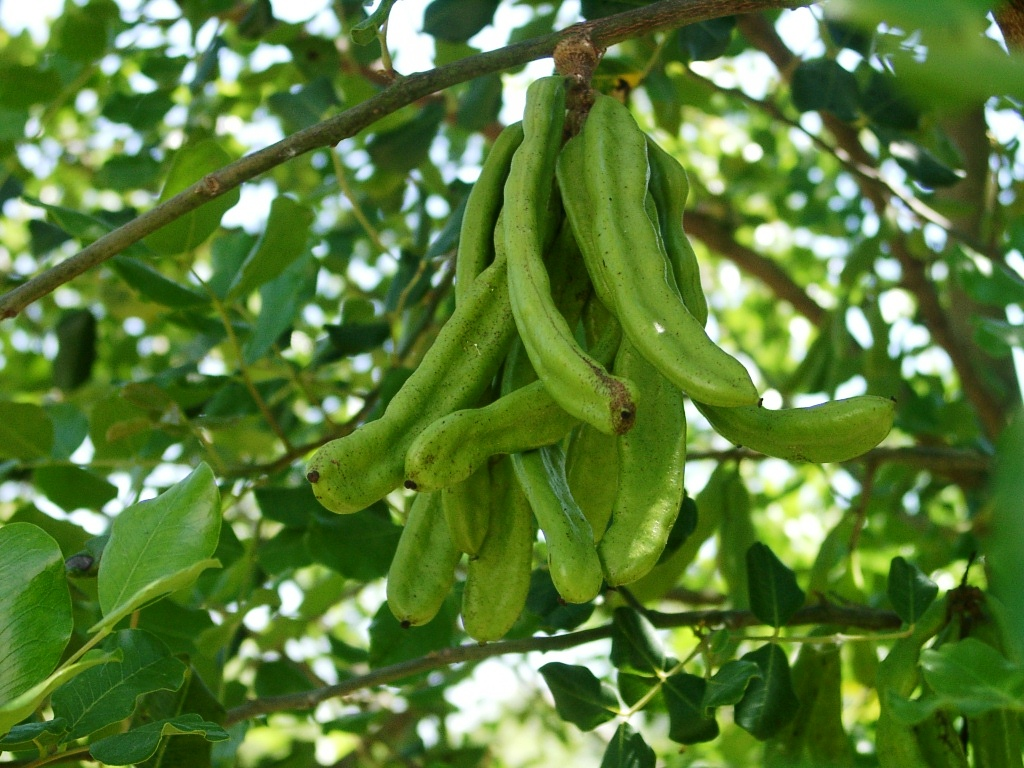
Carob seed pods, used to make carob pod oil

- Amaranth oil, from the seeds of grain amaranth species, including Amaranthus cruentus and Amaranthus hypochondriacus, high in squalene and unsaturated fatty acids.
- Apricot oil, similar to almond oil, which it resembles. Used in cosmetics.
- Apple seed oil, high in linoleic acid.
- Argan oil, from the seeds of the Argania spinosa, is a food oil from Morocco developed through a women's cooperative founded in the 1990s, (Note: The Targanine cooperative was founded by Zoubida Charrouf in the 1990s to help local poor, widowed and divorced women derive an income from producing and exporting high-quality argan oil. See Rainer Höfer, ed. (2009). Sustainable Solutions for Modern Economies. Royal Society of Chemistry (Great Britain). p. 401. ISBN 978-1847559050.) that has also attracted recent attention in Europe.
- Avocado oil, an edible oil used primarily in the cosmetics and pharmaceutical industries. Unusually high smoke point of 510 °F (266 °C).
- Babassu oil, from the seeds of the Attalea speciosa, is similar to, and used as a substitute for, coconut oil.
- Ben oil, extracted from the seeds of the Moringa oleifera. High in behenic acid. Extremely stable edible oil. Also suitable for biofuel.
- Borneo tallow nut oil, extracted from the fruit of species of genus Shorea. Used as a substitute for cocoa butter, and to make soap, candles, cosmetics and medicines in places where the tree is common.
- Cape chestnut oil, also called yangu oil, is a popular oil in Africa for skin care.
- Carob pod oil (Algaroba oil), from carob, with an exceptionally high essential fatty acid content.
- Cherry pit oil is used for culinary purposes as a flavorant.
- Cocoa butter, from the cacao plant, is used in the manufacture of chocolate, as well as in some ointments and cosmetics; sometimes known as theobroma oil
- Cocklebur oil, from species of genus Xanthium, with similar properties to poppyseed oil, similar in taste and smell to sunflower oil.
- Cohune oil, from the Attalea cohune (cohune palm) used as a lubricant, for cooking, soapmaking and as a lamp oil.

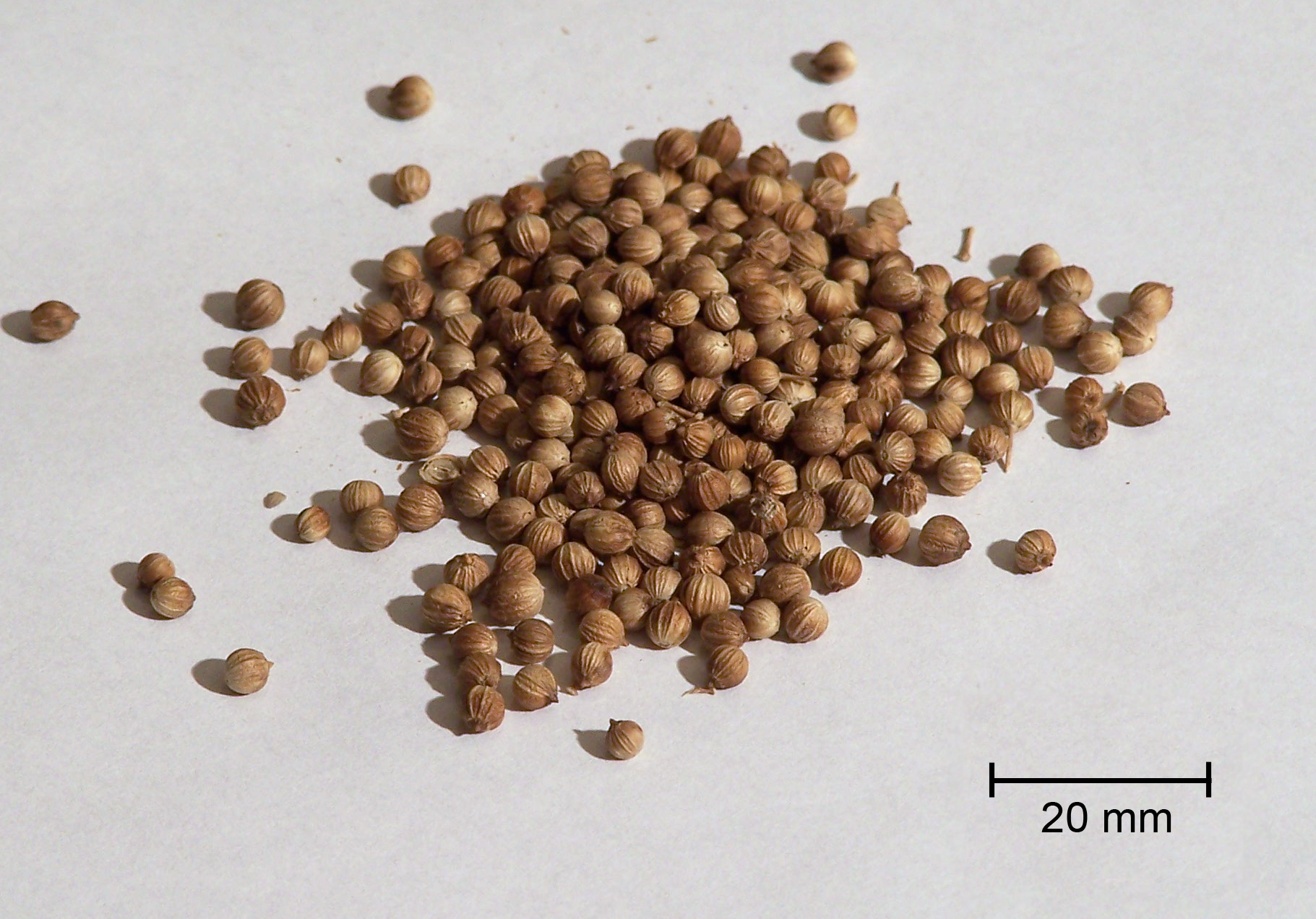
Coriander seeds are the source of an edible pressed oil, Coriander seed oil.

- Coriander seed oil, from coriander seeds, used in a wide variety of flavoring applications, including gin and seasoning blends. Recent research has shown promise for use in killing food-borne bacteria, such as E. coli.
- Date seed oil, extracted from date pits. Its low extraction rate and lack of other distinguishing characteristics make it an unlikely candidate for major use.
- Dika oil, from Irvingia gabonensis seeds, native to West Africa. Used to make margarine, soap and pharmaceuticals, where is it being examined as a tablet lubricant. Largely underdeveloped.
- False flax oil made of the seeds of Camelina sativa. One of the earliest oil crops, dating back to the 6th millennium B.C. Produced in modern times in Central and Eastern Europe; fell out of production in the 1940s. Considered promising as a food or fuel oil.
- Garden cress oil is obtained by cold pressing and is similar to mustard oil but less pungent.
- Grape seed oil, a cooking and salad oil, also sprayed on raisins to help them retain their flavor.
- Hemp oil, a high quality food oil also used to make paints, varnishes, resins and soft soaps.
- Kapok seed oil, from the seeds of Ceiba pentandra, used as an edible oil, and in soap production.
- Kenaf seed oil, from the seeds of Hibiscus cannabinus. An edible oil similar to cottonseed oil, with a long history of use.
- Lallemantia oil, from the seeds of Lallemantia iberica, discovered at archaeological sites in northern Greece.
- Mafura oil, extracted from the seeds of Trichilia emetica. Used as an edible oil in Ethiopia. Mafura butter, extracted as part of the same process when extracting the oil, is not edible, and is used in soap and candle making, as a body ointment, as fuel, and medicinally.
- Marula oil, extracted from the kernel of Sclerocarya birrea. Used as an edible oil with a light, nutty flavor. Also used in soaps. Fatty acid composition is similar to that of olive oil.
- Meadowfoam seed oil, highly stable oil, with over 98% long-chain fatty acids. Competes with rapeseed oil for industrial applications.
- Mustard oil (pressed), used in India as a cooking oil. Also used as a massage oil.
- Niger seed oil is obtained from the edible seeds of the Niger plant, which belongs to the genus Guizotia of the family Asteraceae. The botanical name of the plant is Guizotia abyssinica. Cultivation for the plant originated in the Ethiopian Highlands, and has since spread from Malawi to India.

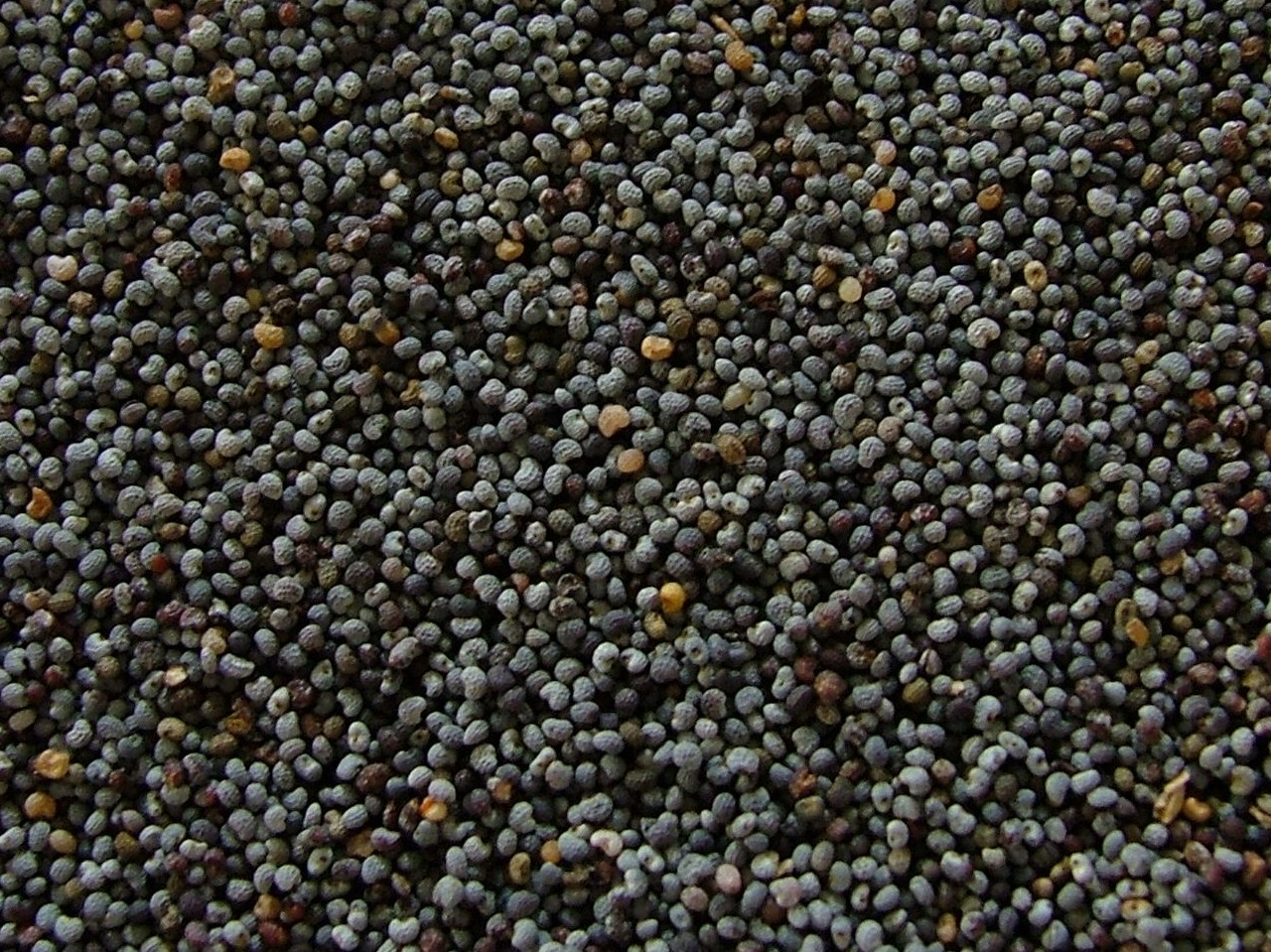
Poppy seeds, used to make poppyseed oil

- Nutmeg butter, extracted by expression from the fruit of cogeners of genus Myristica. Nutmeg butter has a large amount of trimyristin. Nutmeg oil, by contrast, is an essential oil, extracted by steam distillation.
- Okra seed oil, from Abelmoschus esculentus. Composed predominantly of oleic and linoleic acids. The greenish yellow edible oil has a pleasant taste and odor.
- Papaya seed oil, high in omega-3 and omega-6, similar in composition to olive oil. Not to be confused with papaya oil produced by maceration.
- Peach kernel oil is extracted from the seeds of Prunus persica, is chemically similar to apricot kernel oil and sweet almond oil. It is high in oleic acid and linoleic acid, and is used as a light culinary oil, a base for cosmetics, and a carrier oil in skin care.
- Perilla seed oil, high in omega-3 fatty acids. Used as an edible oil, for medicinal purposes in Asian herbal medicine, in skin care products and as a drying oil.
- Persimmon seed oil, extracted from the seeds of Diospyros virginiana. Dark, reddish-brown color, similar in taste to olive oil. Nearly equal content of oleic and linoleic acids.
- Pequi oil, extracted from the seeds of Caryocar brasiliense. Used in Brazil as a highly prized cooking oil.
- Pili nut oil, extracted from the seeds of Canarium ovatum. Used in the Philippines as an edible oil, as well as for a lamp oil.
- Pomegranate seed oil, from Punica granatum seeds, is very high in punicic acid (which takes its name from pomegranates). A topic of current medical research for treating and preventing cancer.
- Poppyseed oil, long used for cooking, in paints, varnishes, and soaps.
- Pracaxi oil, extracted from the seeds of Pentaclethra macroloba. Similar to peanut oil, but has a high concentration of behenic acid (19%).

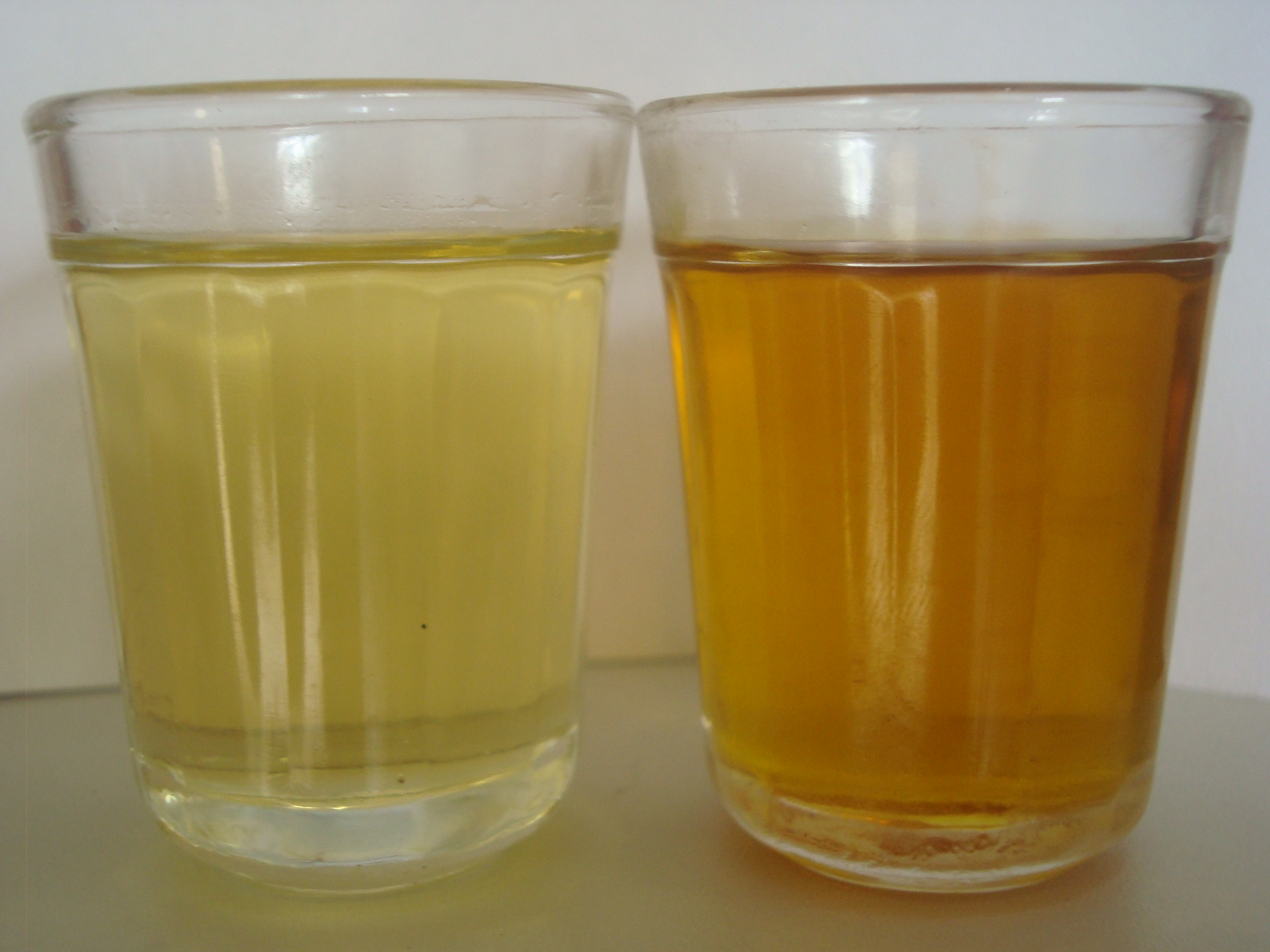
Virgin pracaxi oil

- Prune kernel oil, marketed as a gourmet cooking oil Similar in composition to peach kernel oil.
- Quinoa oil, similar in composition and use to corn oil.
- Ramtil oil, pressed from the seeds of the one of several species of genus Guizotia abyssinica (Niger pea) in India and Ethiopia.
- Rice bran oil is a highly stable cooking and salad oil, suitable for high-temperature cooking. It also has potential as a biofuel.
- Royle oil, pressed from the seeds of Prinsepia utilis, a wild, edible oil shrub that grows in the higher Himalayas. Used medicinally in Nepal.

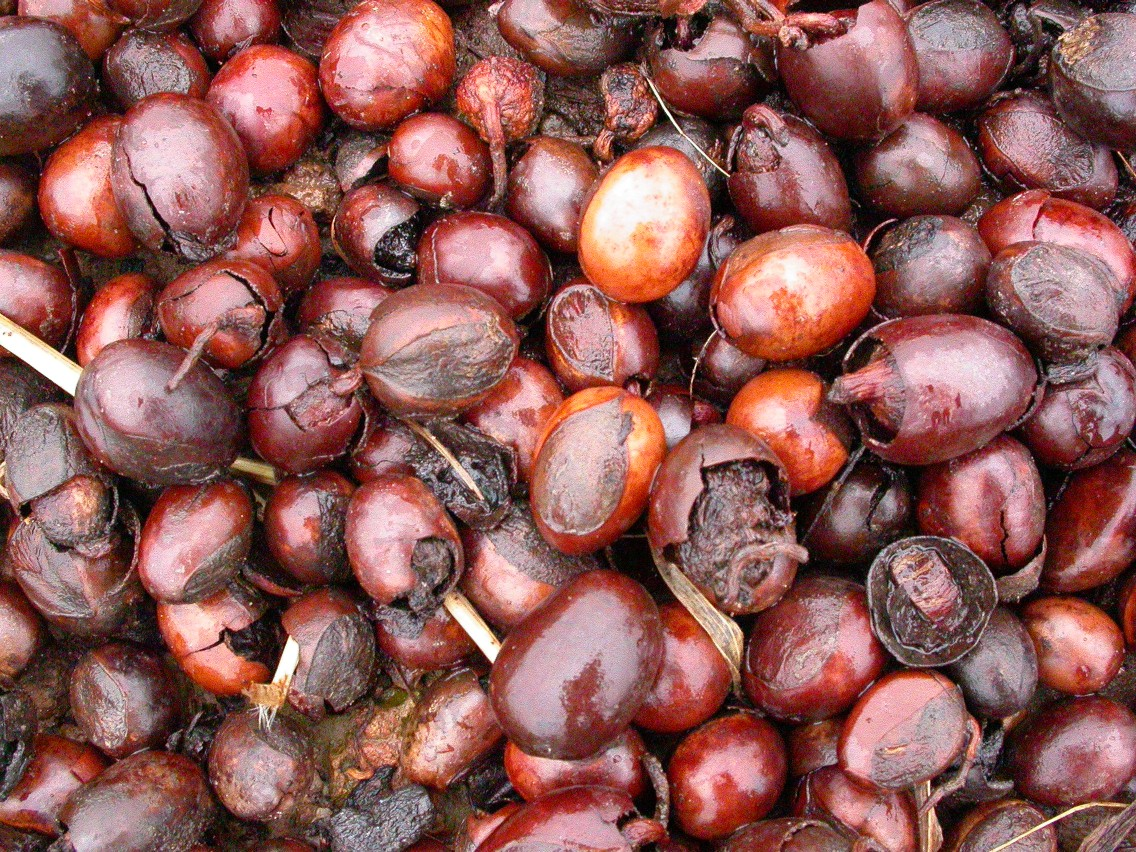
Shea nuts, from which shea butter is pressed

- Sacha inchi oil, from the Peruvian Amazon. High in behenic, omega-3 and omega-6 fatty acids.
- Sapote oil, used as a cooking oil in Guatemala.
- Seje oil, from the seeds of Jessenia bataua. Used in South America as an edible oil, similar to olive oil, as well as for soaps and in the cosmetics industry.
- Shea butter, much of which is produced by African women. Used primarily in skin care products and as a substitute for cocoa butter in confections and cosmetics.
- Taramira oil, from the seeds of the arugula (Eruca sativa), grown in West Asia and Northern India. Used as a (pungent) edible oil after aging to remove acridity.
- Tea seed oil (Camellia oil), widely used in southern China as a cooking oil. Also used in making soaps, hair oils and a variety of other products.
- Thistle oil, pressed from the seeds of Silybum marianum. A good potential source of special fatty acids, carotenoids, tocopherols, phenol compounds and natural anti-oxidants, as well as for generally improving the nutritional value of foods.
- Tigernut oil (or nut-sedge oil) is pressed from the tuber of Cyperus esculentus. It has properties similar to soybean, sunflower and rapeseed oils. It is used in cooking and making soap and has potential as a biodiesel fuel.
- Tobacco seed oil, from the seeds of Nicotiana tabacum and other Nicotiana species. Edible if purified.
- Tomato seed oil is a potentially valuable by-product, as a cooking oil, from the waste seeds generated from processing tomatoes.
- Wheat germ oil, used nutritionally and in cosmetic preparations, high in vitamin E and octacosanol.

== Oils used for biofuel ==
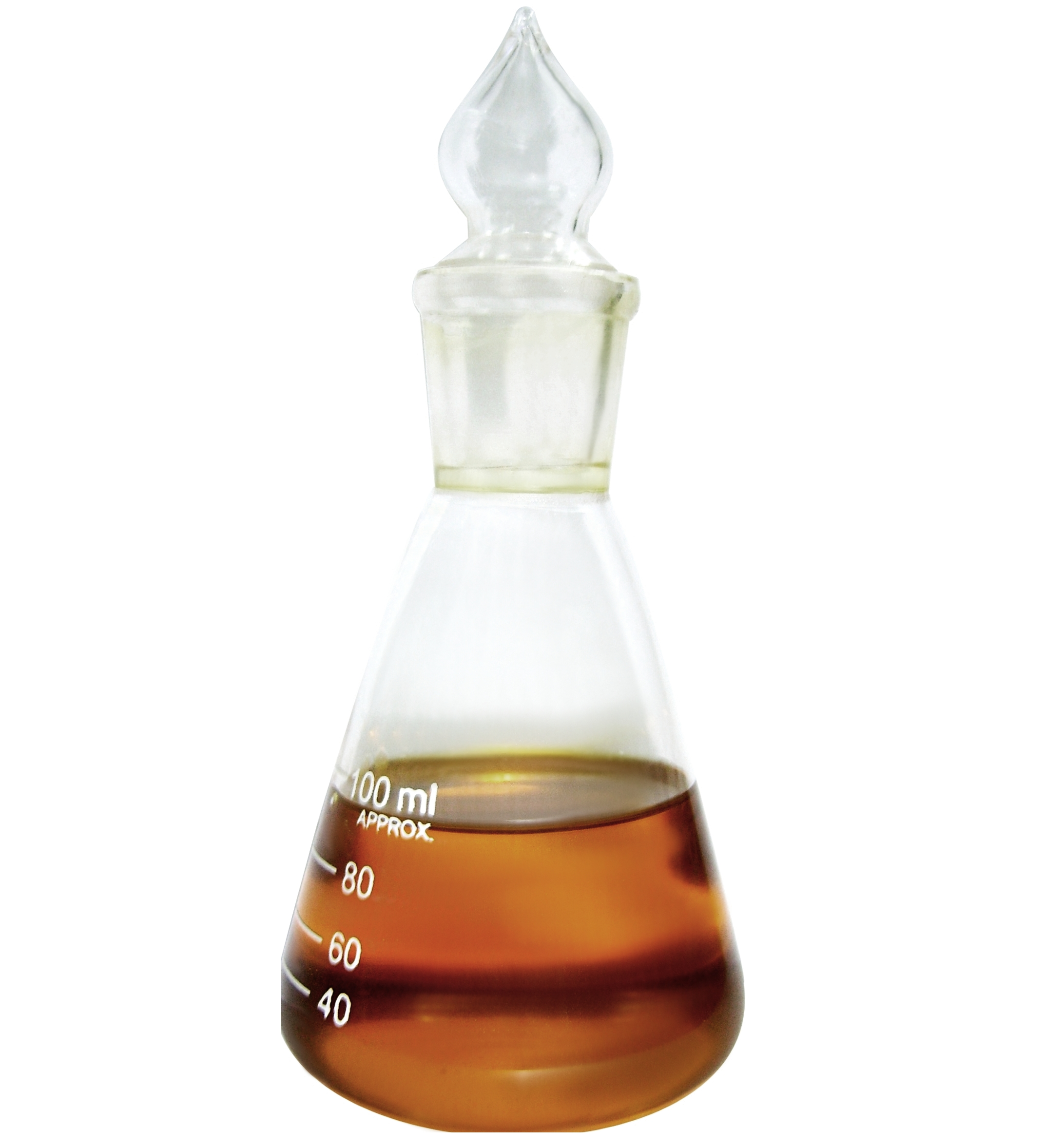
A flask of biodiesel

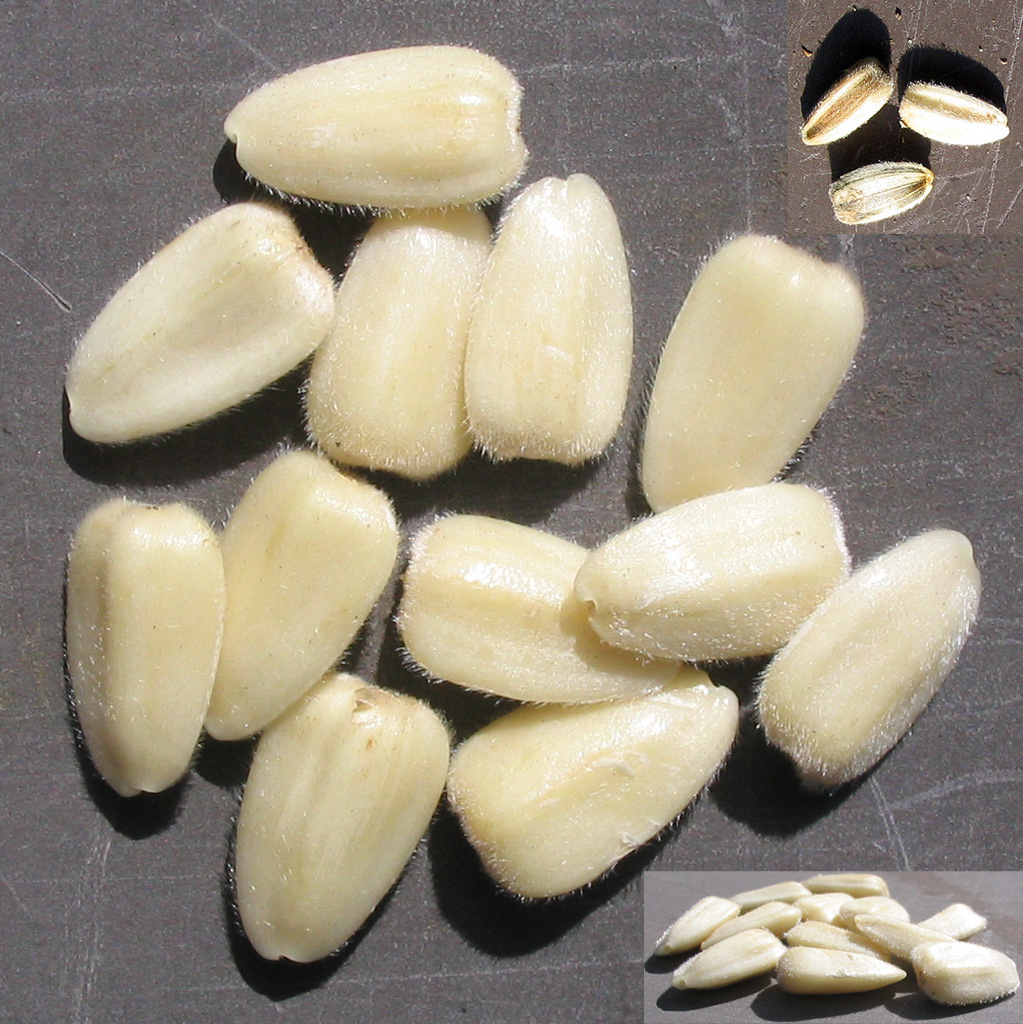
Sunflower kernels

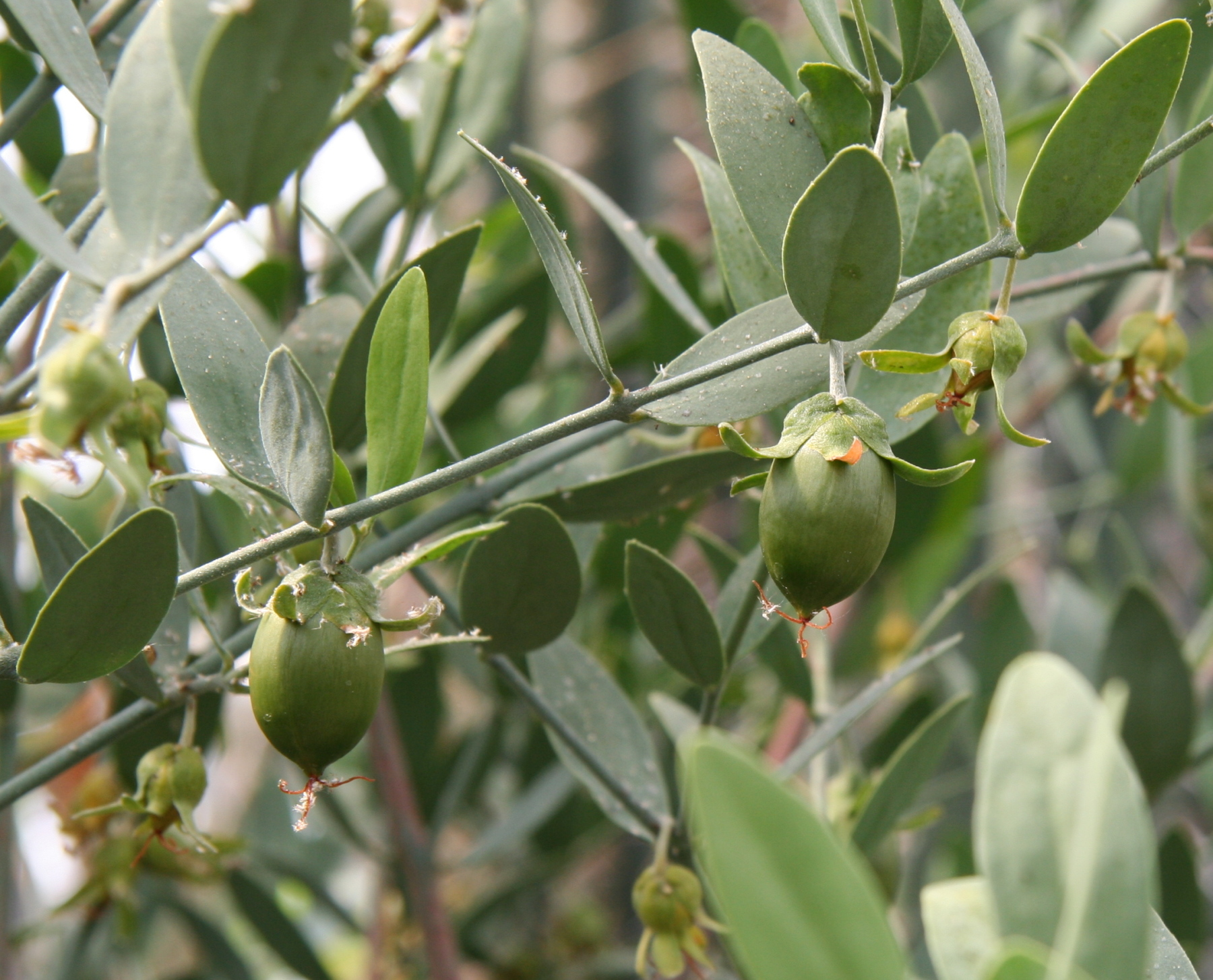
Jojoba fruit

A number of oils are used for biofuel (biodiesel and Straight Vegetable Oil) in addition to having other uses. Other oils are used only as biofuel. (Note: Ethanol and, to a lesser degree, methanol and butanol are the other major types of biofuel.)

Although diesel engines were invented, in part, with vegetable oil in mind, diesel fuel is almost exclusively petroleum-based. Vegetable oils are evaluated for use as a biofuel based on:

1. Suitability as a fuel, based on flash point, energy content, viscosity, combustion products and other factors
2. Cost, based in part on yield, effort required to grow and harvest, and post-harvest processing cost

=== Multipurpose oils also used as biofuel ===
The oils listed immediately below are all (primarily) used for other purposes – all but tung oil are edible – but have been considered for use as biofuel.

- Castor oil, lower cost than many candidates. Kinematic viscosity may be an issue.
- Coconut oil (copra oil), promising for local use in places that produce coconuts.
- Colza oil, from Brassica rapa, var. oleifera (turnip) is closely related to rapeseed (or canola) oil. It is a major source of biodiesel in Germany.
- Corn oil, appealing because of the abundance of maize as a crop.
- Cottonseed oil, the subject of study for cost-effectiveness as a biodiesel feedstock.
- False flax oil, from Camelina sativa, used in Europe in oil lamps until the 18th century.
- Hemp oil, relatively low in emissions. Production is problematic in some countries because of its association with marijuana.
- Mustard oil, shown to be comparable to Canola oil as a biofuel.
- Palm oil, very popular for biofuel, but the environmental impact from growing large quantities of oil palms has recently called the use of palm oil into question.
- Peanut oil, used in one of the first demonstrations of the Diesel engine in 1900.
- Radish oil. Wild radish contains up to 48% oil, making it appealing as a fuel.
- Rapeseed oil, the most common base oil used in Europe in biodiesel production.
- Ramtil oil, used for lighting in India.
- Rice bran oil, appealing because of lower cost than many other vegetable oils. Widely grown in Asia.
- Safflower oil, explored recently as a biofuel in Montana.
- Salicornia oil, from the seeds of Salicornia bigelovii, a halophyte (salt-loving plant) native to Mexico.
- Soybean oil, not economical as a fuel crop, but appealing as a byproduct of soybean crops for other uses.
- Sunflower oil, suitable as a fuel, but not necessarily cost effective.
- Tigernut oil has been described by researchers in China as having "great potential as a biodiesel fuel."
- Tung oil, referenced in several lists of vegetable oils that are suitable for biodiesel. Several factories in China produce biodiesel from tung oil.

=== Inedible oils used only or primarily as biofuel ===
These oils are extracted from plants that are cultivated solely for producing oil-based biofuel. (Note: There are some plants that yield a commercial vegetable oil, that are also used to make other sorts of biofuel. Eucalyptus, for example, has been explored as a means of biomass for producing ethanol. These plants are not listed here.) These, plus the major oils described above, have received much more attention as fuel oils than other plant oils.

- Copaiba, an oleoresin tapped from species of genus Copaifera. Used in Brazil as a cosmetic product and a major source of biodiesel.
- Jatropha oil, widely used in India as a fuel oil. Has attracted strong proponents for use as a biofuel.
- Jojoba oil, from the Simmondsia chinensis, a desert shrub.
- Milk bush, popularized by chemist Melvin Calvin in the 1950s. Researched in the 1980s by Petrobras, the Brazilian national petroleum company.
- Nahor oil, pressed from the kernels of Mesua ferrea, is used in India as a lamp oil.
- Paradise oil, from the seeds of Simarouba glauca, has received interest in India as a feed stock for biodiesel.
- Petroleum nut oil, from the Petroleum nut (Pittosporum resiniferum) native to the Philippines. The Philippine government once explored the use of the petroleum nut as a biofuel.
- Pongamia oil (also known as Honge oil), extracted from Millettia pinnata and pioneered as a biofuel by Udipi Shrinivasa in Bangalore, India.

== Drying oils ==
Drying oils are vegetable oils that dry to a hard finish at normal room temperature. Such oils are used as the basis of oil paints, and in other paint and wood finishing applications. In addition to the oils listed here, walnut, sunflower and safflower oil are also considered to be drying oils.

- Dammar oil, from the Canarium strictum, used in paint as an oil drying agent. Can also be used as a lamp oil.
- Linseed oil's properties as a polymer make it highly suitable for wood finishing, for use in oil paints, as a plasticizer and hardener in putty and in making linoleum. When used in food or medicinally, linseed oil is called flaxseed oil.
- Poppyseed oil, similar in usage to linseed oil but with better color stability.
- Stillingia oil (also called Chinese vegetable tallow oil), obtained by solvent from the seeds of Sapium sebiferum. Used as a drying agent in paints and varnishes.
- Tung oil, used as an industrial lubricant and highly effective drying agent. Also used as a substitute for linseed oil.
- Vernonia oil is produced from the seeds of the Vernonia galamensis. It is composed of 73–80% vernolic acid, which can be used to make epoxies for manufacturing adhesives, varnishes and paints, and industrial coatings.

== Other oils ==
A number of pressed vegetable oils are either not edible, or not used as an edible oil.

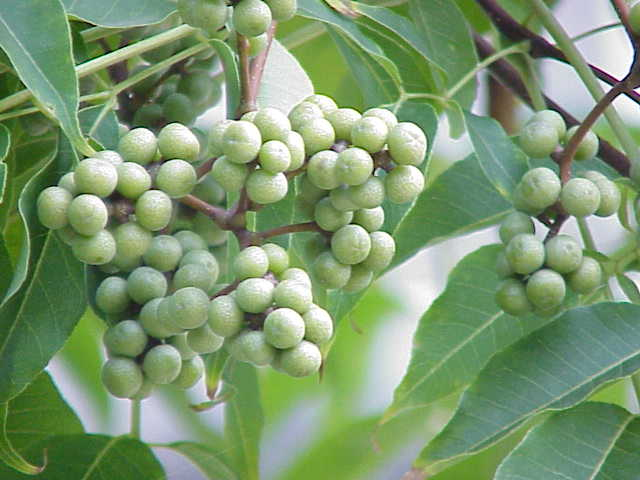
The fruit of the amur cork tree

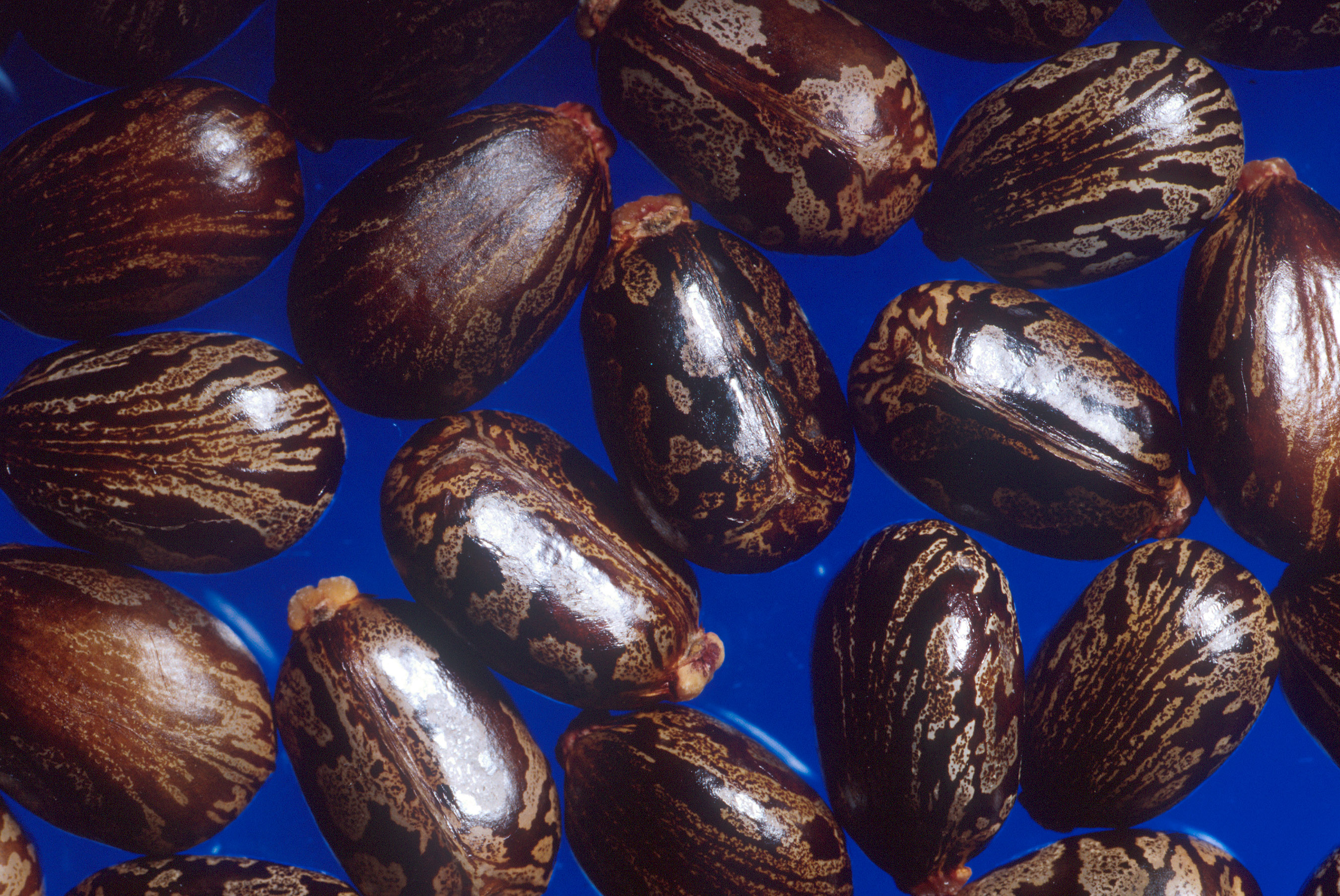
Castor beans are the source of castor oil.

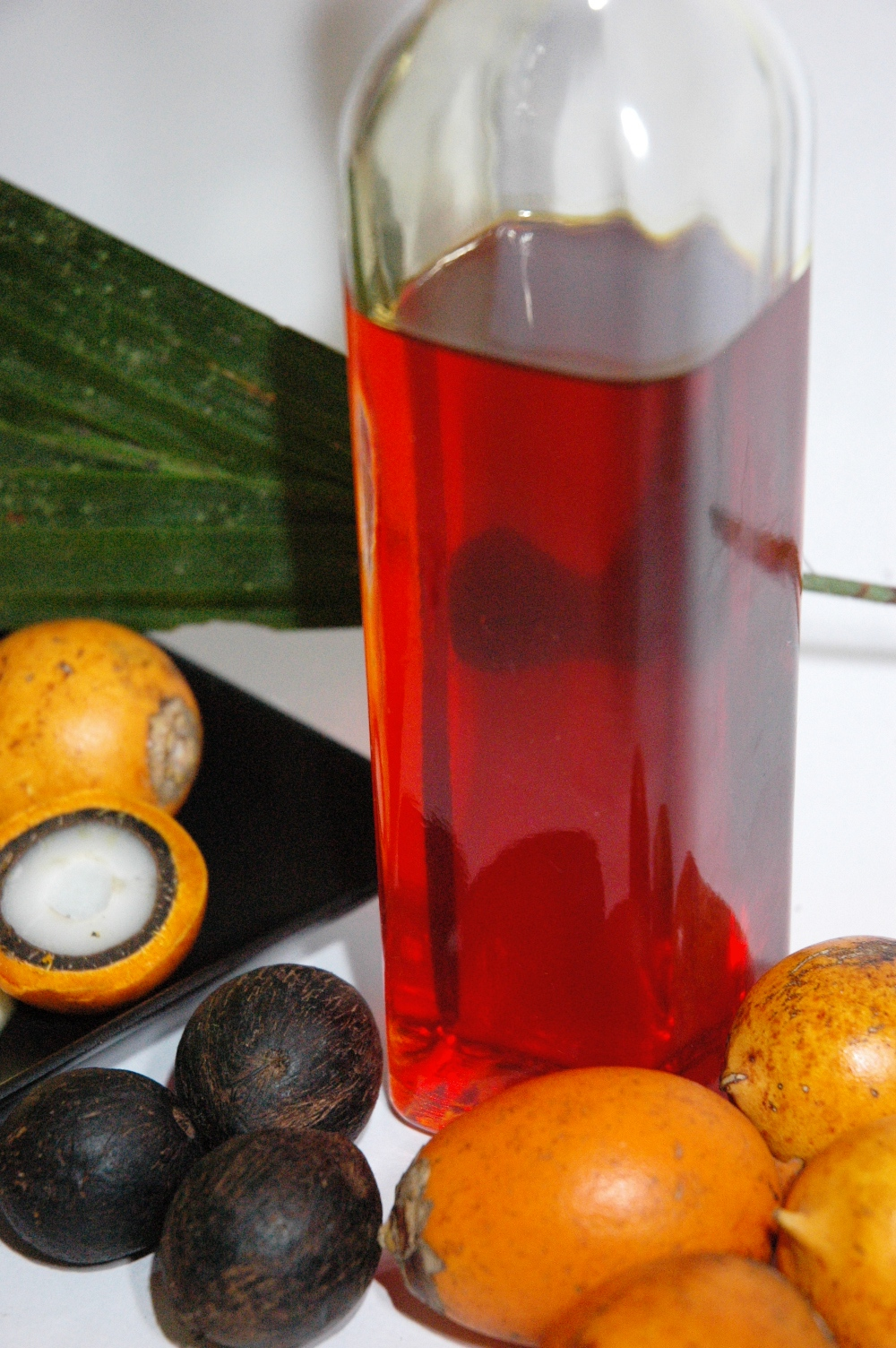
Astrocaryum vulgare (Tucumã) oil

- Amur cork tree fruit oil, pressed from the fruit of the Phellodendron amurense. It has been studied for insecticidal use.
- Artichoke oil, extracted from the seeds of the artichoke fruit, is an unsaturated semi-drying oil with potential applications in making soap, shampoo, alkyd resin and shoe polish.
- Astrocaryum murumuru butter is employed in lotions, creams, soaps hair conditioners, facial masks, shampoo, oils and emulsions, skin moisturizer, products for the nutrition of the hair and restore damaged hair, depilatory waxes.
- Balanos oil, pressed from the seeds of Balanites aegyptiaca, was used in ancient Egypt as the base for perfumes.
- Bladderpod oil, pressed from the seeds of Physaria fendleri, native to North America. Rich in lesquerolic acid, which is chemically similar to the ricinoleic acid found in castor oil. Many industrial uses. Possible substitute for castor oil as it requires much less moisture than castor beans.
- Brucea javanica oil, extracted from the seeds of the Brucea javanica. The oil has been shown to be effective in treating certain cancers.
- Burdock oil (Bur oil) extracted from the root of the burdock. Used as an herbal remedy for scalp conditions.
- Buriti oil, extracted from the Mauritia flexuosa fruit, is high in carotenoids and monounsaturated fatty acids, and of consequent nutritional interest. It is also used in the cosmetics industry.
- Candlenut oil (Kukui nut oil), produced in Hawai'i, used primarily for skin care products.
- Carrot seed oil (pressed), from carrot seeds, used in skin care products. (Note: Carrot seeds are also used to obtain an essential oil with quite different properties than carrot seed pressed oil.)
- Castor oil, with many industrial and medicinal uses. Castor beans are also a source of the toxin ricin.
- Chaulmoogra oil, from the seeds of Hydnocarpus wightiana, used for many centuries, internally and externally, to treat leprosy. Also used to treat secondary syphilis, rheumatism, scrofula, and in phthisis.
- Crambe oil, extracted from the seeds of the Crambe abyssinica. High in erucic acid, used as an industrial lubricant, a corrosion inhibitor, and as an ingredient in the manufacture of synthetic rubber.
- Croton oil (tiglium oil) is pressed from the seeds of Croton tiglium. Highly toxic, it was formerly used as a drastic purgative.
- Cuphea oil, from a number of species of genre Cuphea. Of interest as sources of medium chain triglycerides.
- Cupuaçu butter is closely analogous to cocoa, and is used to make white chocolate.
- Honesty oil, from the seeds of Lunaria annua, which contain 30–40% oil. The oil is particularly rich in long chain fatty acids, including erucic and nervonic acid, making it suitable for certain industrial purposes.
- Illipe butter, from the nuts of Shorea stenoptera (now Rubroshorea stenoptera). Similar to cocoa butter, but with a higher melting point. Used in cosmetics.
- Jojoba oil, used in cosmetics as an alternative to whale oil spermaceti.
- Mango oil, pressed from the stones of the mango fruit, is high in stearic acid, and can be used for making soap.
- Mowrah butter, from the seeds of the Madhuca latifolia and Madhuca longifolia, both native to India. Crude Mowrah butter is used as a fat for spinning wool, for making candles and soap. The refined fat is used as an edible fat and vegetable ghee in India.
- Neem oil, from Azadirachta indica, a brownish-green oil with a high sulfur content, used in cosmetics, for medicinal purposes, and as an insecticide.
- Ojon oil extracted from the nut of the American palm (Elaeis oleifera). Oil extracted from both the nut and husk is also used as an edible oil in Central and South America. Commercialized by a Canadian businessman in the 1990s.
- Passiflora edulis Passion fruit oil is extracted from the seeds and composed mainly of linoleic acid (62%) with smaller amounts of oleic acid (20%) and palmitic acid (7%). It has varied applications in cosmetics manufacturing and for uses as a human or animal food.
- Rose hip seed oil, used primarily in skin care products, particularly for aging or damaged skin.
- Rubber seed oil, pressed from the seeds of the Rubber tree (Hevea brasiliensis), has received attention as a potential use of what otherwise would be a waste product from making rubber. It has been explored as a drying oil in Nigeria, as a diesel fuel in India and as food for livestock in Cambodia and Vietnam.
- Sea buckthorn oil, derived from Hippophae rhamnoides, produced in northern China, used primarily medicinally.
- Sea rocket seed oil, from the halophyte Cakile maritima, native to north Africa, is high in erucic acid, and therefore has potential industrial applications.
- Snowball seed oil (Viburnum oil), from Viburnum opulus seeds. High in tocopherol, carotenoides and unsaturated fatty acids. Used medicinally.
- Tall oil, produced as a byproduct of wood pulp manufacture. A further byproduct called tall oil fatty acid (TOFA) is a cheap source of oleic acid.
- Tamanu or foraha oil from the Calophyllum tacamahaca, is important in Polynesian culture, and, although very expensive, is used for skin care.
- Tonka bean oil (Cumaru oil), popular ingredient in cologne, used medicinally in Brazil.
- Tucumã butter is extracted from both the pulp and seed of the fruit of Astrocaryum vulgare, a South American oil palm. The pulp oil is used as a skin conditioner. The seed oil is sold for use as a cooking oil and for making soap due to its high lauric acid content.
- Ucuhuba seed oil, extracted from the seeds of Virola surinamensis, is unusually high in myristic acid.

== See also ==
- Carrier oil discusses the use of (pressed) vegetable oils, mixed with essential oils
- Fatty acid discusses the components of most vegetable fats and oils
- International Nomenclature of Cosmetic Ingredients explains naming conventions for oils used in cosmetics and soaps
- List of essential oils
