= Oilseed press =

An oilseed press is a machine that lies at the center of vegetable oil extraction. This is due to the fact that this technology is designed to release oil from oilseeds. Multiple oilseed press layouts have been developed over time to complete this process, with each having its own distinct set of advantages and disadvantages. Moreover, the products that are created by oilseed presses, namely oil and oilseed meal, possess great nutritive benefits for humans and livestock respectively. The oilseed press, being at the center of the oil-extraction process, is joined with various other pieces of equipment and procedures that form a pre- and post-extraction system.

== Oilseed press designs ==
Breaking it down to its simplest formulation, the process that oilseed presses carry out appears is quite simple. Oilseed presses essentially extrude or ‘press’ vegetable oil from oil-bearing seeds, which include soybean, sunflower, peanut, safflower, canola, sesame, niger, castor bean, linseed, mustard, coconut, olive, and oil palm. The simplicity of this procedure is shadowed by the diversity of oilseed press designs that perform it. As seen in Table 1, oilseed press designs can be placed into the three major classes of traditional, manual, and mechanical presses.

Traditional presses include ghanis, water extraction systems, and other methods. Aside from the ghani, these designs are generally low yielding and particularly labour intensive. Moreover, all the traditional forms mentioned operate on a batch system. This entails that only a given amount of oilseed can be processed at a given time and, when the oil has been extracted, the pressed oilseed must be cleaned out of the machine. Despite these setbacks, traditional oilseed presses are basic in their design and are composed of easily obtainable or easy-to-manufacture equipment.

As for manual presses, cage style and ram presses are the general layouts. While cage presses operate on a tedious batch system, the operation of ram presses is continuous. The latter point about the ram press design is joined by multiple other advantages that are listed in Table 1. These advantages are especially attractive for developing nations.

The final major class of oilseed presses, the powered press, is dominated by the expeller. These presses also exhibit continuous operation. Furthermore, they are available in a great range of sizes that can process anywhere from a few kilograms per hour to multiple tons per hour. These and other positive attributes (Table 1) are countered by how powered expellers require electricity or fossil fuels and how the components of expellers can wear quickly.

Table 1: Advantages and Drawbacks of Various Oilseed Press Designs

Oilseed Press Class	Oilseed Press Design	Description	Advantages	Disadvantages
Traditional	Ghani	Ghanis originated and are still used widely on the Indian subcontinent. They essentially consists of a large mortar and pestle. Motors or bullocks are utilized to rotate the pestle within the mortar, Some motor-powered ghanis possess a rotating mortar and stationary pestle. The pestle forces out oil and allows it to run out of a small hole in the base of the mortar. When a sufficient amount of oil is extracted, the meal is removed and a new batch of oilseed is added.	-No preliminary grinding of oilseed is required. -Fair yield of high-quality oil -Low operating costs and can be manufactured locally	-Within 3 to 4 hours, a bullock operating a ghani becomes tired and must be replaced by another.[3][16] -Manual models are slow and require a skilled operator for optimum oil extraction.
	Water Extraction	Ground oilseed is boiled for several hours and oil is skimmed off the surface. The oil is then heated to remove any water that persists.	-Equipment is readily available, uncomplicated procedure -Final heating removes water and improves shelf life of oil	-Low yielding -Laborious process -Long boiling sessions consume substantial quantities of fuel -Oil-water emulsions can form and these cause for issues in removing traces of moisture in the final process.
	Other	There are various methods of extraction including wedges, levers, heavy stones, and twisted ropes.	-Simple machines, easy to access equipment	-Low yielding, small capacity, physically demanding
Manual	Cage Press	A press plate or piston is forced through a vertical perforated cylinder via a threaded rod, large scissor levers, or a hydraulic cylinder.	-Maximum pressure can be maintained for a short period of time, allowing for the small amount of remaining oil to be squeezed out. -Simple to use	-Like the traditional designs, cage presses operate on a batch system. Only a set amount of oilseed can be pressed at once and the press must be cleaned out after each batch. -When using a hydraulic cylinder for applying pressure, care must be taken so that hydraulic fluid does not leak into the product.
	Ram Press	The ram press consists of a piston that is manually forced through a horizontal perforated cylinder via a lever. Upon the piston’s return stroke, more seed automatically falls into the compression chamber, which is otherwise closed off by the piston. A hole at the end of the chamber provides an exit for pressed material and can be adjusted to regulate the pressure exerted.	-The gap at the end of the cage and the piston’s ability to act as its own valve allow for continuous operation. -Smaller models can be operated with ease by women. -Buckets, screens, plastic sheets, and containers are the only extra equipment required. -The design allows for increased ‘shearing’ action which contributes the breakdown of material and extraction of oil. -Much higher efficiency with some materials as compared to cage presses. -High pressures* of 190 to 200 kg/cm^{2} are attained. This is similar to the 170 kg/cm^{2} pressures applied by small expellers and is greater than the maximum 125 kg/cm^{2} applied by cage presses -Can be effectively manufactured and repaired locally -Unlike for cage presses, the seed coats of soft-shelled seeds do not have to be removed.	-Attempting to press particularly hard seeds causes for decreased oil yield and may result in the press being damaged.
Powered	Expeller	Oil expellers are composed of a rotating worm within a horizontal cylinder that gradually increases the pressure on the oilseed within. Like for the ram press, an adjustable choke at the end of the cylinder can adjust the pressure that is applied.	-Continuous operation -Predominant power-driven oilseed press design in the world -Models that process anything from a few kg/hour to tons/hour are available. -Friction within the cylinder generates heat that improves oil yield. -Small and medium-sized powered expellers exert high pressures on the raw product.* These pressures are 170 and 540 kg/cm^{2} respectively.	-Electricity or fossil fuels are required to drive larger models. -Motorized expellers produce lower-quality oil as compared to cold-press systems. -The rings, choke, and the end of the worm wear down quickly. Ready access to parts and skilled labour is a requirement.

Note: *Pressure is a good indicator of pressing efficiency for oilseed presses.

== Nutritional value of products ==
No matter the design, the same end products are obtained from the operation of an oilseed press. After the oil is removed from the oilseed, an oilseed meal or cake remains. This valuable by-product is especially rich in protein. Aside from safflower and sunflower meal, most oilseed meals contain around 40% crude protein. Although this allows most oilseed meals to be readily applied as protein supplements for ruminants such as cattle, the truth is that many of these meals have undesirable amino acid ratios or exhibit poor digestibility which limits their use in swine and poultry diets.

An exception to this trend is soybean meal. It possesses an excellent amino acid profile, a low fibre content, high digestibility, and high crude protein levels ranging from 44 to 50%. These advantages, including soybean meal’s high lysine content of 6.5%, make it a very appropriate protein supplement in poultry and swine as well as ruminant diets. In fact, soybean meal accounts for 63% of the protein feed sources that are utilized globally. This surpasses the next-leading canola meal, which is also nutritionally adept for feeding to poultry and swine, by a full 51%.

In addition to the meal, the oil that is procured from oilseed presses possesses nutritive benefits. Oils are naturally energy-dense materials that constitute about 25% of the total caloric intake of the typical individual. Particularly, vegetable oils are composed mainly of unsaturated fats (EUFIC, 2014; Indiana University 2014; Zambiazi et al., 2007), which include the essential omega-3 and -6 polyunsaturated fatty acids. Animal-based fats, in contrast, contain saturated fats, which are linked to cardiovascular disease.

Different oilseed species possess unique fatty acid profiles. This same principle applies to the oil contents of various oilseeds as well. For example, while canola typically exhibits an oil content of around 40-45 %, soybeans consist of about 20% oil. Despite these specifics, the amount of oil extracted depends on the efficiency of the extraction process (Lardy, 2008). Decreased oil yield is detrimental in the perspective of oil production, yet is potentially beneficial for livestock producers since the leftover cake’s nutritive value is augmented.

== Oil extraction process ==
The actual extruding of vegetable oil from oilseeds by oilseed presses is preceded and followed by several other activities. The first step in the procedure is to have clean, dry seed. Removing material such as rocks, soil, chaff, leaves, sand, dust, and other foreign particles augments pressing efficiency, reduces wear, and decreases the chances of damage being done to the press. Drying seed to around 10% prevents the press from being clogged and also prevents the spread of mould during storage.

For seeds with hard seed coats such as sunflowers or groundnuts, dehusking or decortication is required. This removal of the seed coats improves productivity and reduces bulk. In addition to decortication, preliminary milling for some oilseeds such as groundnuts is needed. Before the oilseed can be pressed, scorching or heating of the seed may also have to be conducted. An example of this is how soybeans must be roasted to deactivate trypsin inhibitors that are anti-nutritional for swine and poultry. In general, warming seed before processing increases oil yield. Although the best seed temperature for pressing is 38-71 °C, it is known that warming sunflower seed in the sun for just a half hour raises oil yields by 25%.

All of this leads up to that actual pressing of the oilseed, which is followed by more procedures that involve processing the oil. Clarification removes small contaminants and impurities in the oil by letting the oil sit for a period, which allows the particles to settle. Further clarification can be done by heating the oil or filtering it through a fine cloth. Clarification extends the shelf-life of the oil from days to months.

Degumming, bleaching, neutralization, and deodorizing are all processes that follow clarification. These procedures are often not applicable to developing nations due to their complexity and the fact that the flavours of unrefined oils are well accepted in these areas. Whether these processes are applied or not, the oil must be stored in some way. Storage containers should be filled with oil to the top, completely clean, air and water tight, and opaque in colour. Moreover, oil should be stored in a cool area away from light.
