= Types of plant oils =

Plant oils or vegetable oils are oils derived from plant sources, as opposed to animal fats or petroleum. There are three primary types of plant oil, differing both the means of extracting the relevant parts of the plant, and in the nature of the resulting oil:

1. Vegetable fats and oils were historically extracted by putting part of the plant under pressure, squeezing out the oil.
2. Macerated oils consist of a base oil to which parts of plants are added.
3. Essential oils are composed of volatile aromatic compounds, extracted from plants by distillation.

== Vegetable fats and oils ==
Vegetable fats and oils are what are most commonly called vegetable oils. These are triglyceride-based, and include cooking oils like canola oil, solid oils like cocoa butter, oils used in paint like linseed oil and oils used for industrial purposes. Pressed vegetable oils are extracted from the plant containing the oil (usually the seed), using one of two types of oil press. The most common is the screw press, which consists of a large-diameter metal screw inside a metal housing. Oil seeds are fed into the housing, where the screws mash the seeds, and create pressure which forces the oil out through small holes in the side of the press. The remaining solids, called seed cake, are either discarded or used for other purposes. Oil presses can be either manual or powered. The second type of oil press is the ram press, where a piston is driven into a cylinder, crushing the seeds and forcing out the oil. Ram presses are generally more efficient than screw presses.

There has been recent interest in improving the design of mechanical oil presses, particularly for use in developing countries. A press developed at MIT's D-Lab, for example, is capable of exerting 800–1,000psi to extract peanut oil.

Industrial machines for extracting oil mechanically are call expellers. Many expellers add heat and pressure, in order to increase the amount of oil extracted. If the temperature does not exceed 120 °F, the oil can be called "cold-pressed".

In modern vegetable oil production, oils are usually extracted chemically, using a solvent such as hexane. Chemical extraction is cheaper and more efficient than mechanical extraction, at a large scale, leaving only 0.5–0.7% of the oil in the plant solids, as compared to 6–14% for mechanical extraction.

== Macerated oils ==
Macerated or infused oils are oils to which other matter has been added, such as herbs or flowers. Typically, the oil used is a food-grade fat-type oil.

== Essential oils ==
Essential oils are not true oils but volatile aromatic compounds that are used in flavors, fragrances, and in aromatherapy for health purposes. Essential oils are usually extracted by distillation.

Maceration is also used as a means of extracting essential oils. In this process, used, for example, to extract the onion, garlic, wintergreen and bitter almond essential oil, the plant material is macerated in warm water to release the volatile compounds in the plant.

== See also ==
- Triglyceride
- Vegetable fats and oils
- List of vegetable oils
- List of essential oils
