= The Honey Pot Company =

Feminine care product producer

- Type: Subsidiary
- Industry: Personal care
- Founded: 2014; 12 years ago
- Founder: Beatrice Dixon
- Parent: Compass Diversified Holdings
- Website: thehoneypot.co

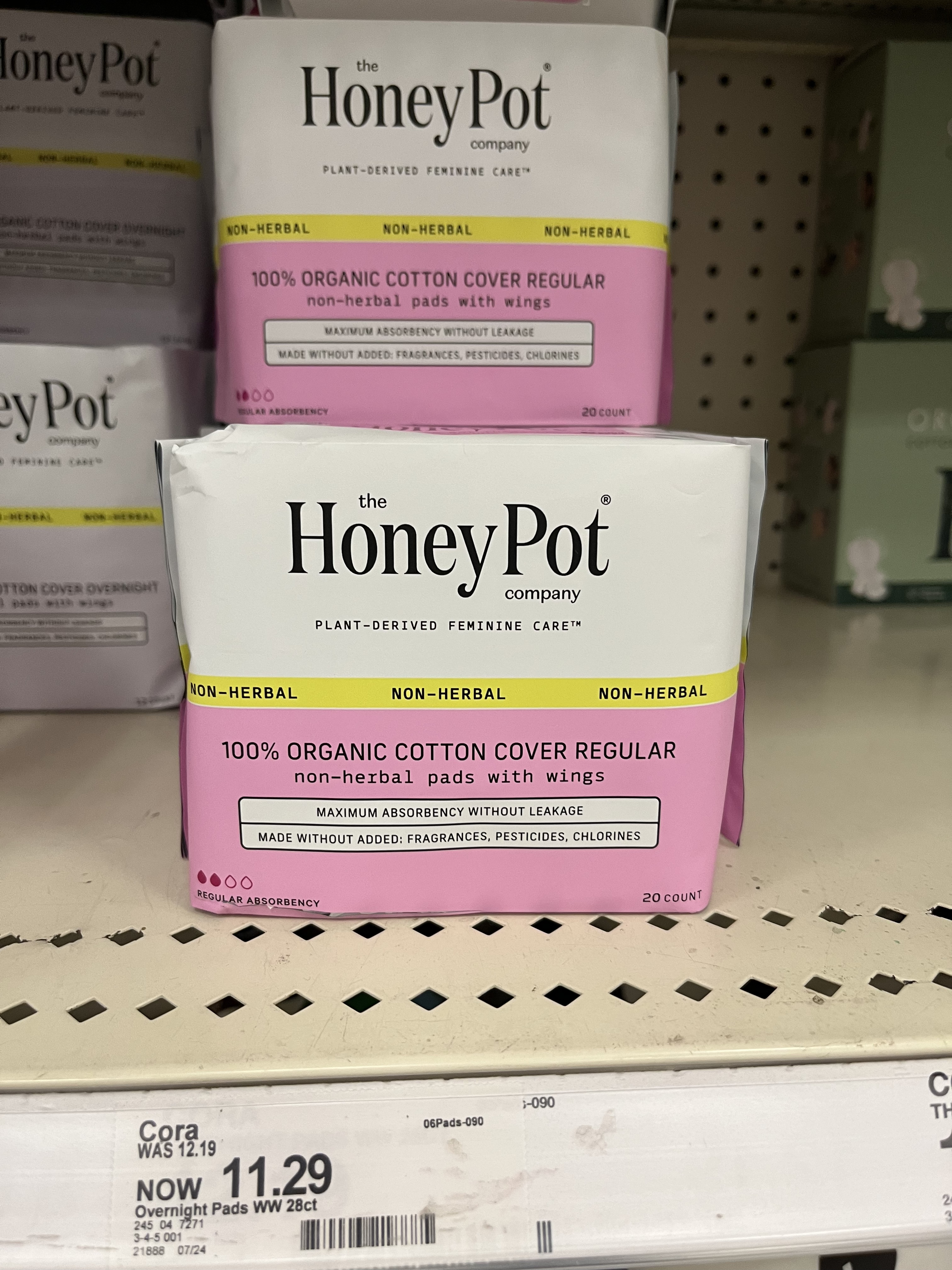
Honey Pot Pads

The Honey Pot Company is a feminine care product producer that uses natural, plant based ingredients. The company was founded by Beatrice Dixon and is now majority-owned by Compass Diversified Holdings, with Dixon retaining a minority stake. The products are available for purchase in major retail stores like Target, Walmart, and Walgreens. Since the company was founded, The Honey Pot Company has acquired 4.6 million customers and in 2023 had a gross sale of $121 million.

== History ==
The Honey Pot Company was founded by Beatrice Dixon with help from Simon Grey in 2014. As a child, Dixon suffered from bacterial vaginosis, which spurred her to create a product that would soothe her condition. Her goal was to create a gynecologist approved and natural ingredient product that would be safe to use on women's intimate areas. Dixon stated that her late grandmother visited her in a dream and gave her a list of ingredients to use that would cure her condition. The next day, Dixon bought the ingredients at Whole Foods and started working on creating a remedy. Dixon received positive reactions from her friends.

Simon Grey gave Dixon a $21,000 loan in order for her to start her company. Dixon considered Grey to be a brother, rather than a close friend. Grey graduated from Bentley where he studied finance and accounting. Dixon made Grey the co-founder and Chief Cultural Officer of The Honey Pot Company. While starting The Honey Pot Company, she had a full time job and it was not until her products gained popularity and started being sold at Target that she quit her job. With Dixon focusing full time on her company, her effort led to her products being sold in major retail stores like Walmart and CVS, in addition to Target.

In January 2024, Compass Diversified Holdings announced that it would acquire a majority stake in The Honey Pot Company for $380 million.

== Products ==
The Honey Pot Company uses natural ingredients such as apple cider vinegar, garlic extract, grapefruit seed extract, coconut oil, lavender, and rose in their products. Their products are free of chemicals, parabens, carcinogens, and sulfates. Other notable products are yeast balance vaginal health supplements, boric acid and herbs suppositories, anti itch soothing wipes, and urinary tract support vaginal health supplements. Additionally, they sell intimacy care products for before and after participating in sexual activities as well as skin care which contain all natural ingredients.

== Lawsuit ==
The Honey Pot Company has been a part of two lawsuits: Cameron Thierry v. The Honey Pot Company (DE), LLC on July 7, 2018 and McAuley v. Honey Pot Co., LLC on March 1, 2024.

Cameron Thierry v. The Honey Pot Company (DE), LLC was a lawsuit by Cameron Thierry, the co-Chief Financial Officer of Honey Pot, alleging that an oral contract had been violated. Thierry claimed that The Honey Pot Company failed to support their claims of full time employment and adequate compensation after acquiring a $3 million investment. The courts dismissed his suit and denied his motion for reconsideration on the basis of statute of limitations.

McAuley v. Honey Pot Co., LLC was a putative class action from consumers who claimed that Honey Pot products were not safe for women. This case was dismissed on the basis of insufficient evidence to support their claims that the products or ingredients were harmful.

== Marketing ==
In 2020, The Honey Pot Company partnered with Mercedes-Benz Stadium located in Atlanta, Georgia. During Beyonce's famous tour, Renaissance World Tour, The Honey Pot Company placed three different products in the bathrooms around the stadium. To obtain one of products, free of cost, concert-goers had to scan the QR code which required them to enter an email address.

On Instagram, the marketing team has introduced Miss Pussy P who gives advice on how to use products as well as her personal experiences. The team has also created cartoons in hopes of reaching their goal of educating, supporting, and being able to provide others with advice on their own intimacy areas. During Black History Month, The Honey Pot Company joined the Reclaiming Wellness Campaign at Howard University located in Washington, D.C, where they offered products, a master class with Dixon, and encouraged the students to explore the company's approach of having a healthier lifestyle.
