= Sacha inchi oil =

Oil from pracaxi fruits

Sacha inchi oil is extracted by pressing it from the seeds and flesh of the fruit from the Plukenetia volubilis, or pracaxi, a tree native to the area surrounding the Amazon River.

Sacha Inchi oil has with approximately 50% a very high content of the omega-3 fatty acid alpha-linolenic acid, which makes it comparable to flaxseed oil. Sacha Inchi oil has a very high content of Tocopherols (176–226 mg/100 g) which consists predominantly of gamma-Tocopherol (50%) and delta-Tocopherol.

== Pracaxi ==
While Sacha Inchi is called 'Pracaxi' there are other plants with very different properties by the same name. Not to be confused with Sacha Inchi is the oil of Pentaclethara macroloba which is also called Pracaxi. This oil is distinguished by a particularly high amount of the fatty acid behenic acid, a characteristic that it shares with ben oil.
