= Extract =

Category of substance

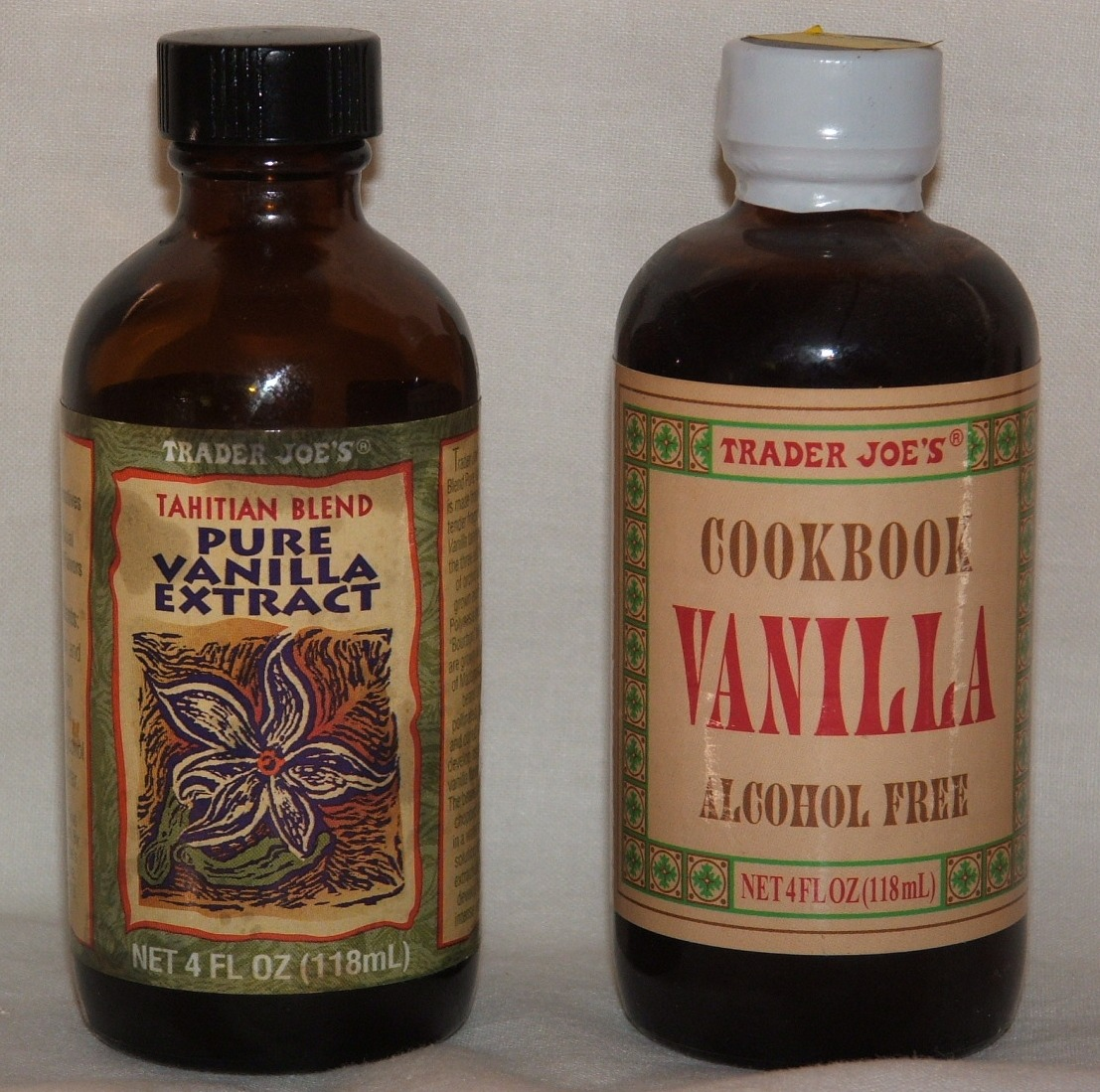
Vanilla extract

An extract (essence) is a substance made by extracting a part of a raw material, often by using a solvent such as ethanol, oil or water. Extracts may be sold as tinctures or absolutes or dried and powdered.

Extracts are widely used in various industries, such as perfumes, cosmetics, pharmaceuticals, and the food industry, among others.

The aromatic principles of many spices, nuts, herbs, fruits, etc., and some flowers, are marketed as extracts, among the best known of true extracts being almond, cinnamon, cloves, ginger, lemon, nutmeg, orange, peppermint, pistachio, rose, spearmint, vanilla, violet, rum, and wintergreen.

== Extraction techniques ==
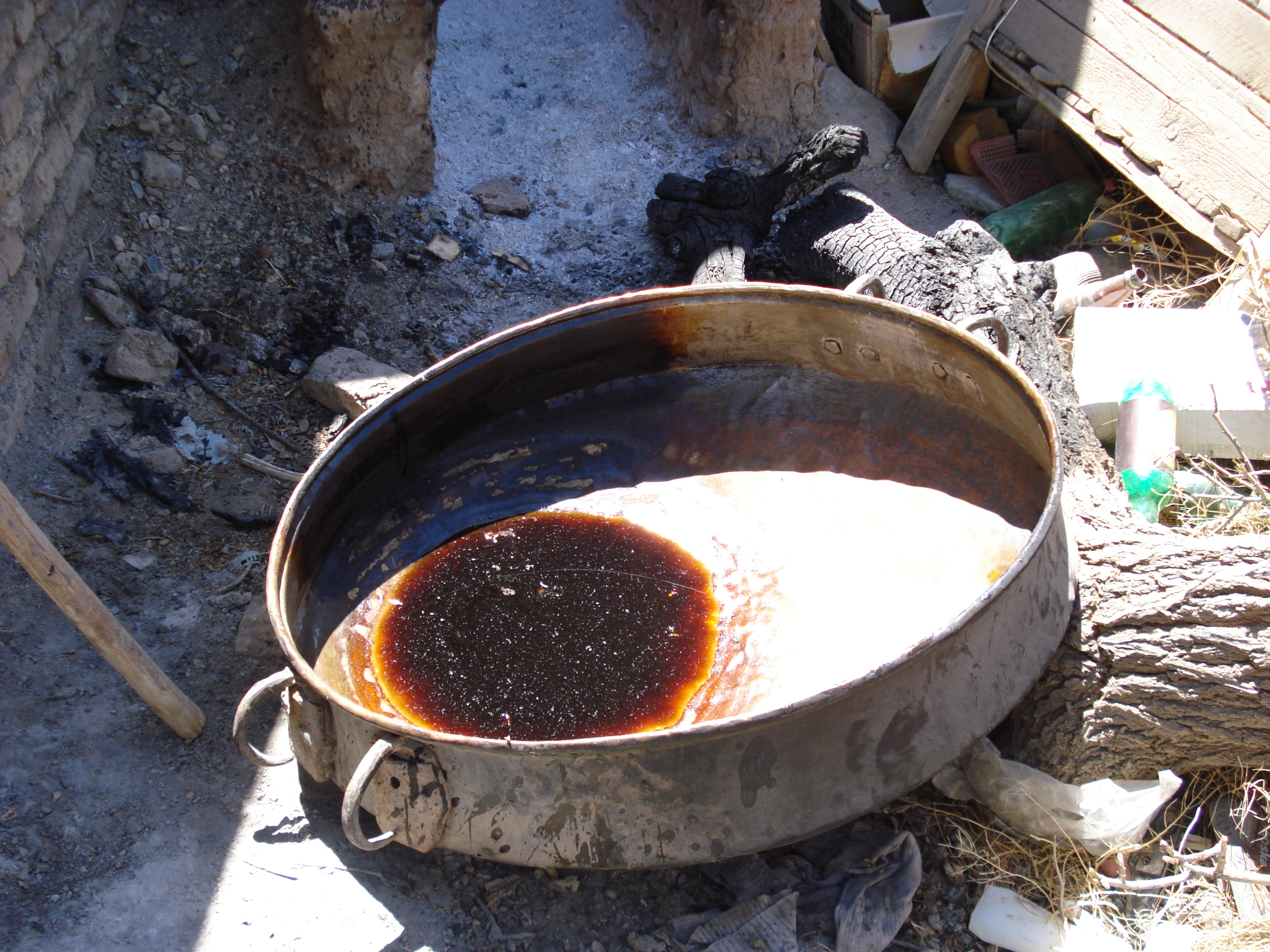
Traditional extraction pot in Iran

Most natural essences are obtained by extracting the essential oil from the feedstock, such as blossoms, fruit, and roots, or from intact plants through multiple techniques and methods:

- Expression (juicing, pressing) involves physical extraction material from feedstock, used when the oil is plentiful and easily obtained from materials such as citrus peels, olives, and grapes.
- Absorption (steeping, decoction). Extraction is done by soaking material in a solvent, as used for vanilla beans or tea leaves.
- Maceration, as used to soften and degrade material without heat, normally using oils, such as for peppermint extract and wine making.
- Distillation or separation process, creating a higher concentration of the extract by heating material to a specific boiling point, then collecting this and condensing the extract, leaving the unwanted material behind, as used for lavender extract.

The distinctive flavors of nearly all fruits are desirable adjuncts to many food preparations, but only a few are practical sources of sufficiently concentrated flavor extract, such as from lemons, oranges, and vanilla beans.

== Artificial extracts ==
The majority of concentrated fruit flavors, such as banana, cherry, peach, pineapple, raspberry, and strawberry, are produced by combining a variety of esters with special oils. Suitable coloring is generally obtained by the use of dyes. Among the esters most generally employed are ethyl acetate and ethyl butyrate. The chief factors in the production of artificial banana, pineapple, and strawberry extract are amyl acetate and amyl butyrate.

Artificial extracts generally do not possess the delicacy of natural fruit flavor but usually taste sufficiently similar to be useful when true essences are unobtainable or too expensive.

== See also ==
- Extraction (chemistry)
- Vanilla extract
