= Tonka bean oil =

Oil from the seeds of Dipteryx odorata

Tonka bean oil is extracted from the seed of Dipteryx odorata.

== Overview ==
The oil is composed primarily of coumarin, which is used to flavor tobacco. It is neither a pressed oil, nor an essential oil, but was traditionally obtained by soaking the large, single tonka bean seed in rum or other alcohol for 24 hours, after which crystals of coumarin appear on the outside of the seed, and are then collected.

The seeds contain up to 46% oil by dry weight. In recent years, most commercially produced coumarin are synthetic, which has reduced the demand for tonka beans as a crop. Coumarin derivatives are also used medicinally, as anti-coagulants.

== See also ==
- Amaranth oil
- Artichoke oil
