= Carrier oil =

Diluent, excipient

Carrier oil, also known as base oil, is the excipient or vehicle used to dilute active ingredients in pharamaceuticals, to dilute essential oils and absolutes in massage and aromatherapy, and to carry other compounds to facilitate their easy incorporation into food. They are so named because they carry the ingredient at a safe concentration.

Both mineral oil (liquid paraffin) and vegetable oils may used be for ingestion (food and oral drugs like laxatives), on-skin use (massage, ointments, cosmetics), and in-air use (aromatherapy). For injection generally only vegetable oils are approved for human use, as mineral oil is hard to break down and causes an inflmmation (it is considered acceptable in veterinary vaccines in controlled amounts as an immunologic adjuvant).

- For food use, national agencies such as the US Food and Drug Administration (FDA) set standards for purity and amounts of use.
- For pharmaceutical use, drug compendia such as the United States Pharmacopeia (USP) set standards for purity.

== Massage and aromatherapy ==
Diluting essential oils is a critical safety practice when using essential oils. Essential oils alone are volatile; they begin to dissipate as soon as they are applied. The rate of dispersion varies based on factors such as viscosity, vapour pressure, and the molecular weight of the volatile components. Carrier oils do not contain a concentrated aroma, unlike essential oils, though some, such as olive, have a mild distinctive smell. Neither do they evaporate like essential oils, which are more volatile. The carrier oils used should be as natural and unadulterated as possible. Many people feel organic oils are of higher quality. Cold-pressing and maceration are the two main methods of producing carrier oils.

There is a range of different carrier oils, each with a various therapeutic properties. Choosing an oil will depend on the area being massaged, the presenting conditions and the clients sensitivity and requirements. For massage, viscosity is a major consideration; for example, grape seed oil is typically very thin, while olive oil is much thicker. Sunflower, sweet almond and grape seed oils have viscosities midway between these extremes. Carrier oils can be easily blended to combine their properties of viscosity, acceptability, lubrication, absorption, aroma and so forth.

Infused oils are a combination of a carrier oil and plant material and they can be either commercially or domestically prepared. A base oil, often sunflower, is placed in an airtight container with the appropriate plant material for a time. Calendula and carrot oils are produced in this way.

High quality oils sold for culinary use are often eminently suitable for massage use, and are economical; those obtained by cold pressing are preferred. All carrier oils should be kept cool, and away from strong light, to retard rancidification. Rancid oils should be avoided. Refrigerating oils helps preserve their freshness but some oils should not be refrigerated (e.g. avocado). Very cold oils may appear cloudy, but regain their clear state on returning to room temperature.

Sources passionately disagree on the suitability of mineral oil as a carrier oil.

== Varieties ==
True carrier oils are generally cold-pressed or macerated vegetable oils taken from, among others:

- Apricot oil
- Grape seed oil
- Avocado oil
- Olive oil
- Sesame oil
- Evening primrose oil
- Canola (rapeseed oil)
- Camellia seed oil
- Sunflower oil
- Marula oil
- Jojoba oil
- Emu oil
- Castor oil
- Borage seed oil
- Nuts:
  - Walnut oil
  - Peanut oil
  - Pecan oil
  - Macadamia oil
  - Fractionated coconut oil
  - Hazelnut oil
  - Cocoa butter
  - Sweet almond oil

== Safety aspects ==
Peanuts are legumes, not true nuts, but they share with true nuts the risk of causing allergic reactions, even in minute amounts. Pure peanut and nut-derived oils are not usually allergenic (as they do not typically contain the proteinaceous part of the plant), but avoiding them may be safer, as serious peanut and nut allergy is widespread, oil purity cannot be guaranteed, and other hypoallergenic oils are easily substituted.
