= Ramtil oil =

Ramtil oil, also known as Niger seed oil, is used mainly in cooking but also for lighting. In India it is pressed from the seed of Guizotia oleifera of the family Asteraceae. A very similar oil is made in Africa from G. abyssinica. The oil is used as an extender for sesame oil, which it resembles, as well as for making soap, in addition to its role as an illuminant.

== Countries ==
The plant was originally cultivated in the Ethiopian highlands but is also cultivated in Mexico, Germany, Brazil, Nepal, India as well as other parts of Southeast Asia.

== Composition ==
The oil is rich in linoleic acid (75-80%) and other essential nutrients, with a fatty acid composition comparable to safflower and sunflower. The oil contains palmitic and stearic acids (7-8%) and oleic acid (5-8%). Indian Niger oil is reportedly higher in oleic acid (25%) and lower in linoleic acid (55%).

== Ethiopia revival ==
There was an extended declining period of Niger seed oil production, due to the import of cheap palm oils, but an apparent waning appetite for these, and a government ban on oil imports, there has been a marked revival and several manufacturers produce one, two, three and five liters of oil.
