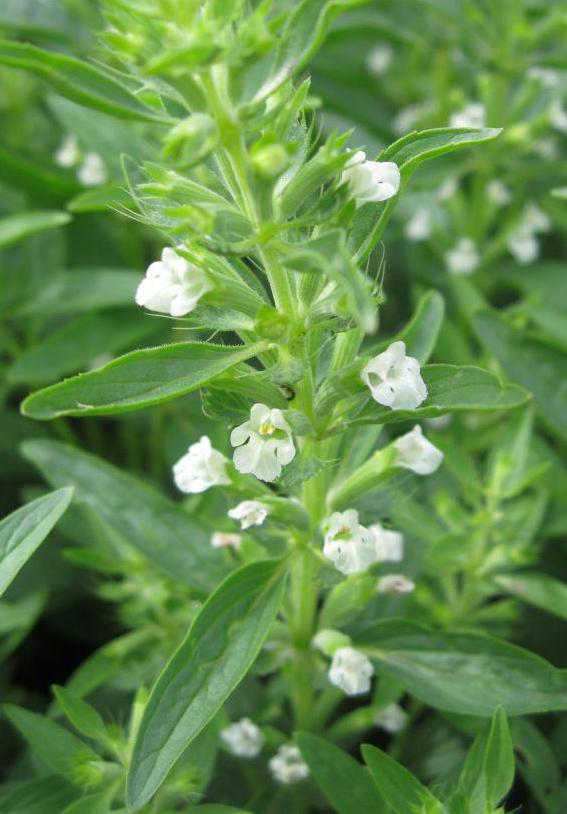
- Lallemantia iberica

Scientific classification
- Kingdom: Plantae
- Clade: Tracheophytes
- Clade: Angiosperms
- Clade: Eudicots
- Clade: Asterids
- Order: Lamiales
- Family: Lamiaceae
- Genus: Lallemantia
- Species: L. iberica

Binomial name
- Lallemantia iberica (M.Bieb.) Fisch. & C.A.Mey.

= Lallemantia iberica =

Species of flowering plant

Lallemantia iberica, known commonly as dragon's head, is a species of flowering plant in the mint family, Lamiaceae.

The plant has been cultivated for its seeds in southwestern Asia and southeastern Europe since prehistoric times. Originally from the Caucasus and the Middle East, it spread throughout European and eastern countries. Its vernacular name in Iran is balangu shahri. The seeds contain the edible oil known as lallemantia oil. The oil content of the seeds is about 30%, sometimes reaching up to 38%. The oil is used as a substitute for linseed oil in the production of varnish, furniture polish, ink, paint, soap, and linoleum.

Uses and possibilities

Lallemantia iberica has a broad range of potential pharmaceutical and dietary uses. Traditionally, it is used as a medical plant for the treatment of common cold, coughing, stomach and abdominal pain. The fatty acid pattern of its oil, with many mono-acids and high amounts of omega-3-fatty acids, makes it nutritionally robust. Use as a preventative against cancer, an inhibitor of the aging process, as well as its analgesic, antibacterial and antioxidant effects are of high interest and are currently researched.

The plant oil of Lallemantia iberica has a high content of alpha-linoleic acid. This shows great potential in the chemical industry as an epoxidized oil, which can in turn be used for plasticizers and stabilizers in rubber and also in the production of paints, varnishes and linoleum due to its fast drying ability. The seed mucilage of Lallemantia iberica is further investigated as a smart edible film.

Cultural practices

The autumn sowing, in comparison with the spring sowing, has positive effect on many parameters. Seed yield per plant, essential oil content and yield and antioxidant components of dragon's head showed better results in autumn sowing. Autumn sowing also leads to better results on morphological traits. The seedbed should be fine-grained and reconsolidated, since the dragon's head is a fine seed. After a proper tillage the optimal time for sowing is between mid-March and mid-April, when the temperature is constantly over 2 °C and 3 °C. Light frosts are not considered a major threat to the seedling. Due to its short vegetation period (90-120 days) a later sowing time is also applicable. This will lead to some losses in oil contents. The seed rate should be approximately 15 kg/ha (= 300 to 350 plants/m²). It is necessary to sow as flat as possible, the sowing depth should not exceed 2-3 cm. The seedlings generally emerge after one or two weeks.

Fertilizers also have an effect on quantitative and qualitative characteristics of Lallemantia iberica. Yield, yield components (like antioxidant concentration, etc.) of dragon's head were improved by the fertilization with thiobacillus and vermicompost. In general this cultivar has a low demand for nitrogen. This means the nitrogen application should not exceed 70 kg N/ha. To sum up, autumn sowing with thiobacillus, varmicompost or NPK fertilizer create a high antioxidant activity.

Because the canopy is fast closing (generally three weeks after emergence) often no weed control is necessary. In wet years or on unfavorable locations, there is a risk of Botrytis stem rot. Overly dense sown crops increase the risk of disease.

Harvesting is usually carried out with a combined harvester at the beginning of August. The stubble height should be as low as possible, because the seed set starts at approximately 10 cm above the soil. To achieve high storability it is necessary to reach at least 9% humidity.

This plant is an annual herb growing to an average height around 40 cm (16 in). The toothed or serrated leaves are in opposite pairs at the stem nodes. Inflorescences emerge from the leaf axils and bear white, lipped flowers each about 1 cm (0.4 in) long. They are pollinated by insects.
