= Garden cress oil =

Garden cress oil is obtained from garden cress (Lepidium sativum L) seeds, by cold pressing (hydraulic pressing), solvent extraction (soxhlet) and supercritical CO_{2}. The total oil content of garden cress seeds is 21.54% (by solvent extraction method) garden cress oil has a typical smell of mustard oil but less pungent than mustard oil.
