= Snowball seed oil =

Extracted from the seeds of Viburnum opulus

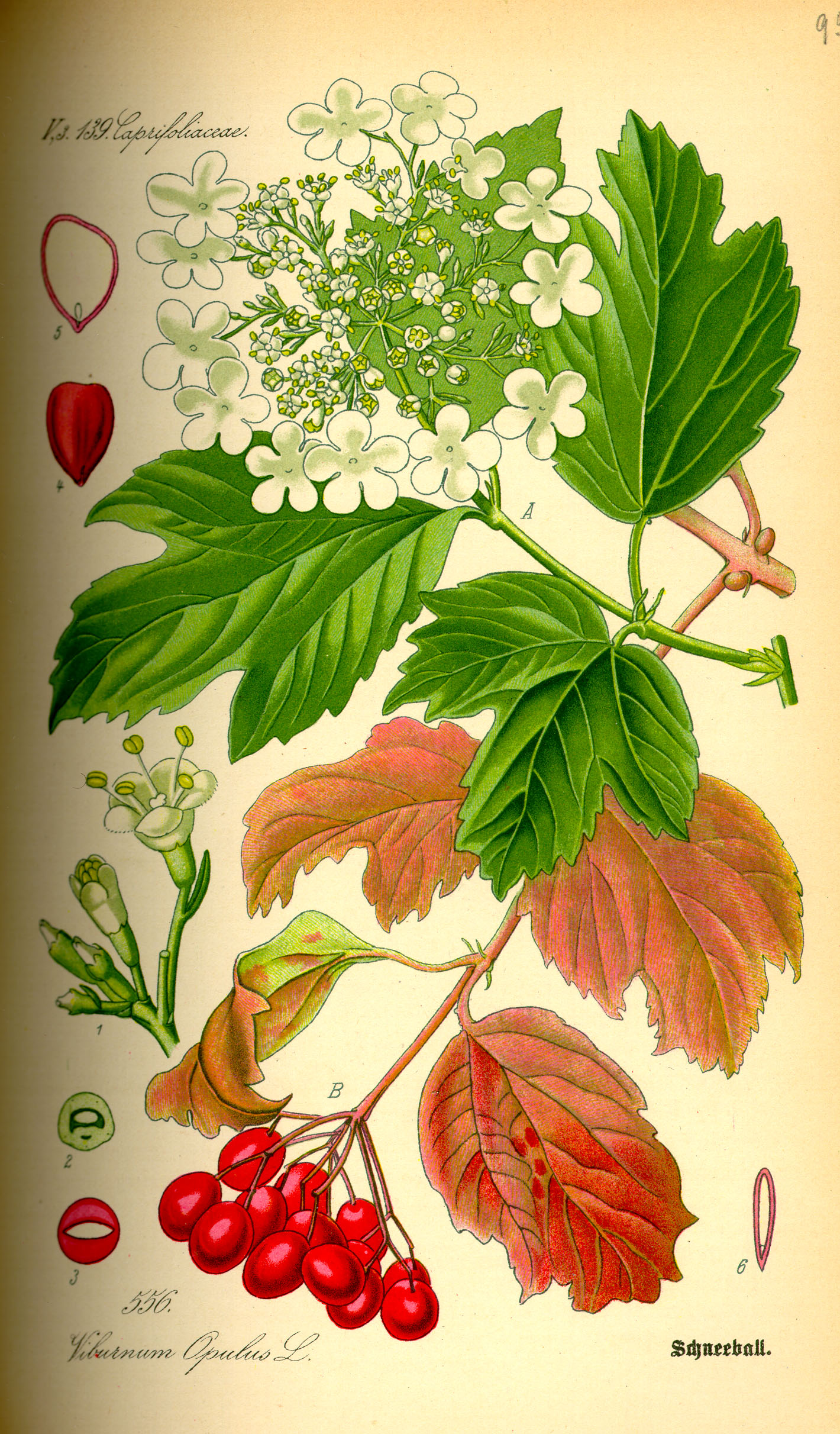
Viburnum opulus

Snowball seed oil is a pressed seed oil, extracted from the seeds of the Viburnum opulus (common snowball), which grows in Russia. Snowball bark contains a variety of bioactive substances, including tannic substances, saponins, vitamin K_{1}, ascorbic acid and carotene, and is used medicinally. The seeds, which contain up to 21% oil, are rich in tocopherol (Vitamin E), carotinoides (provitamin A) and micronutrients. Snowball seed oil is little known or used outside Russia.
