= Carob pod oil =

Edible oil from carob beans

Carob pod oil (Algaroba oil) is an edible oil pressed from carob beans, used medicinally.

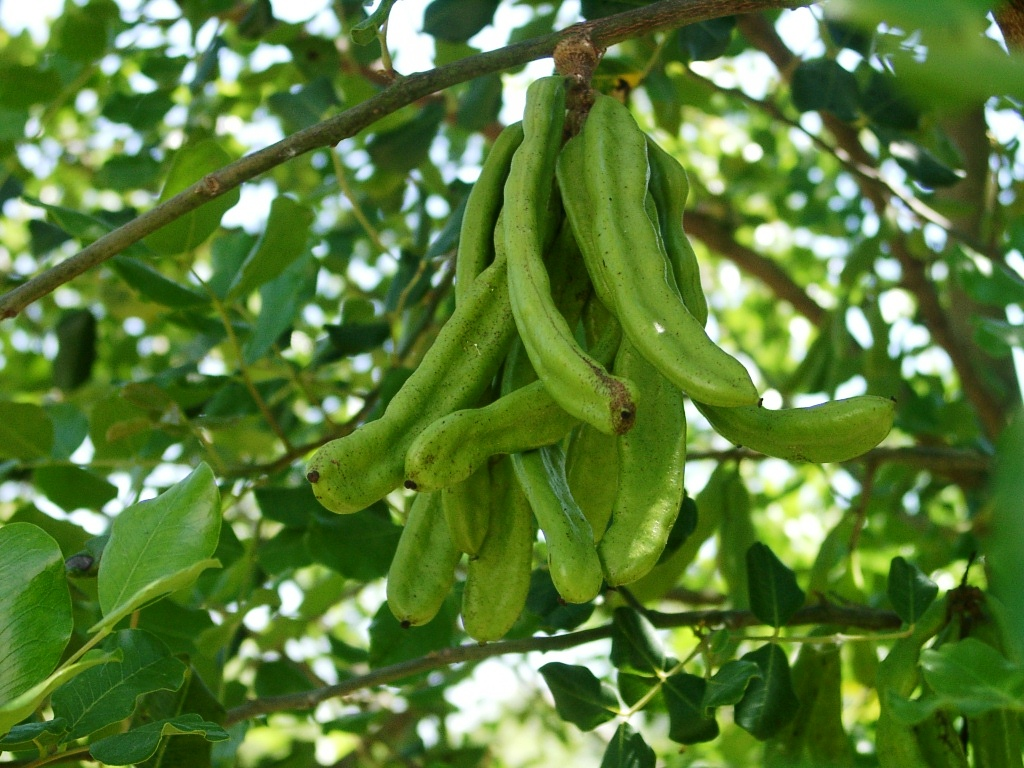
Carob beans, used to make carob pod oil.

The fatty acid composition of carob pod oil is:

Fatty acid	Percentage
Palmitic	14.2%
Stearic	3.0%
Oleic	38.5%
Linoleic	43.6%
