= Ben oil =

Ben oil is pressed from the seeds of the Moringa oleifera, known variously as the horseradish tree, ben oil tree, or drumstick tree. The oil is characterized by an unusually long shelf life and has been described to have a mild but pleasant taste. The name of the oil is derived from the presence of behenic acid. The oil's components are:

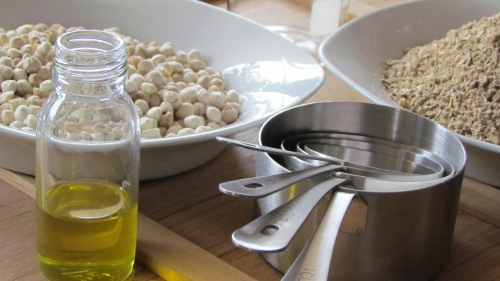
Ben oil

Component	Percentage
Oleic acids	65.7%
Palmitic acid	9.3%
Stearic acid	7.4%
Behenic acid	8.6%

Seeds offer a relatively high yield of 22-38% oil. Ben oil has been used for thousands of years as a perfume base, and continues to be used in that capacity today. The oil can also be used as a fuel. Burkill reports:

It burns with a clear light and without smoke. It is an excellent salad oil, and gives a good soap... It can be used for oiling machinery, and indeed has a reputation for this purpose as watch oil, but is now superseded by sperm oil.

== History ==
=== Greece ===
The ancient Greeks manufactured ben oil and other herbal oils. Theophrastos, in the fourth century BC, had very strong opinions about which oils to use to make perfumes, and ben oil was firmly at the top of the list.

=== Rome ===
In Rome, around 70 AD, Pliny the Elder described the tree and its fruits under the name myrobalanum after the Greek word myron meaning "ointment". Around the same time Dioscorides described the fruit as balanos myrepsike (roughly "acorn-shaped fruit well-suited for preparation of fragrant ointments"). He observed that "grinding the kernels, like bitter almonds, produces a liquid which is used instead of oil to prepare precious ointments." Dioscorides' recommendation was influential in promoting the "balanos" fruits and their oil for medicinal purposes.

=== Alexandria ===
During the same era, Alexandria in Egypt had become the predominant center for the production of perfumes. This was still true when the Arabs captured the city in 642 AD and became familiar with both the fruits and the oil. The Arabic word for myrobalanum included not merely the fruit, but also the oil and the herbal oils extracted from it. That Arabic herbal oils usually included myrrh resin, Indian cardamom, and other types of cardamom led to a common misunderstanding: Portuguese botanists who started exploring the Far East in the 16th century wasted years trying to find the tree that produced the fragrant myrobalan oil before they realized that it was just an extract of a plant which they already knew.

=== Europe ===
Another misunderstanding arose when a new Malaysian fruit reached Europe through the Arabs. The Europeans confused it with myrobalan and called the new fruits "myrobalans". The problem was only solved by simply renaming the old fruit, borrowing the Arabic bān for the new name. It was enough to separate the two products, but confusion was still common for several hundred years since both were used in medicines. Naturally the ben fruits of antiquity were not the same as the ben fruits of modern times.

=== Jamaica ===
Interest in ben oil in Jamaica began in the first half of the 19th century. The oil had a reputation for being extremely durable and was often used to lubricate fine mechanics (clocks, for example). In 1848, the oil was analyzed for the first time and a new type of saturated fatty acid was found and was given the name behenic acid.

=== Grasse ===
At the perfume manufactury in Grasse, France, ben oil was used as a maceration oil for herbal oil until it was replaced by cheaper types of oil, alcohol and newly invented solvent agents in the 1870s. In the 1930s it was again put to use, but was then again forgotten as a component of perfume making, probably mostly due to political turmoil in many European colonies. Ben oil was forgotten for much of the rest of the 20th century as a watch oil.

== See also ==
- Vegetable oil
- List of vegetable oils
