= Lallemantia oil =

Seed oil

Lallemantia oil is a seed oil, extracted from the seeds of the Lallemantia iberica. It contains 68% linolenic acid, making it an unusually rich source, and of potential commercial interest. Lallemantia oil has been discovered at a number of archeological sites in northern Greece, dating from the Bronze Age. As the plant is not native to this region, the presence of this oil suggests that it was imported from further east.

== Uses ==
Lallemantia oil is a drying oil, and can be used as a substitute for linseed oil in this and other contexts. The oil is also edible.
