= Grapefruit seed extract =

Extract derived from grapefruit seeds

Grapefruit seed extract (GSE), also known as citrus seed extract, is a liquid extract derived from the seeds, pulp, and white membranes of grapefruit. GSE is prepared by grinding the grapefruit seed and juiceless pulp, then mixing with glycerin. Commercially available GSEs sold to consumers are made from the seed, pulp, and glycerin blended together. GSE is sold as a dietary supplement and is used in cosmetics.

== Grapefruit history ==
The grapefruit is a subtropical citrus tree grown for its fruit which was originally named the "forbidden fruit" of Barbados. The fruit was first documented in 1750 by Rev. Griffith Hughes when describing specimens from Barbados. All parts of the fruit can be used. The fruit is mainly consumed for its tangy juice. The peel can be processed into aromatherapy oils and is also a source of dietary fiber. The seed and pulp, as byproducts of the juice industry, are retrieved for GSE processing or sold as cattle feed.

== Efficacy ==
Despite claims that GSE has antimicrobial effects, there is no scientific evidence that GSE has such properties. Some evidence indicates that the suspected antimicrobial activity of GSE was due to the contamination or adulteration of commercial GSE preparations with synthetic antimicrobials or preservatives. These chemicals were not present in grapefruit seed extracts prepared in the laboratory, and GSE preparations without the contaminants were found to possess no detectable antimicrobial effect. Although citrus seed extract is sold in health food markets, there is no good evidence for any antimicrobial activity.

== Phytochemicals ==
Analysis shows the phytochemicals of the seed extract and pulp are flavonoids, ascorbic acid (vitamin C), tocopherols, citric acid, limonoids, sterols, and minerals.

== Preparations ==
GSE is prepared by grinding the grapefruit seed and juiceless pulp, then mixing with glycerin. Commercially available GSE is made from the seed, pulp, glycerin, and synthetic preservatives all blended together.

== Health claims and safety concerns ==
Although various health claims for using GSE are marketed in the dietary supplement industry, there is no scientific evidence from high-quality clinical research that it has any health effects, as of 2018. Phytochemicals in grapefruit seeds, particularly furanocoumarins and flavonoids, may cause adverse effects on health resulting from grapefruit–drug interactions that influence the intended therapeutic effects of some 85 prescription drugs. The main safety concern about GSE is inhibition of the liver enzyme, cytochrome P450, which controls liver metabolism of drugs; consequently, its inhibition by GSE unpredictably increases the blood concentrations of prescribed drugs.
