= Macerated oil =

Macerated oils are vegetable oils to which other matter, such as herbs, has been added. Commercially available macerated oils include all these, and others. Herbalists and aromatherapists use not only these pure macerated oils, but blends of these oils, as well, and may macerate virtually any known herb. Base oils commonly used for maceration include almond oil, sunflower oil, and olive oil as well as other food-grade triglyceride vegetable oils, but other oils are used as well.
