= Artichoke oil =

Oil from the seeds of the Cynara cardunculus

Artichoke oil is extracted from the seeds of the Cynara cardunculus (cardoon). It is similar in composition to safflower and sunflower oil. The fatty acid composition of artichoke oil is:

Fatty acid	Percentage
Linoleic	60%
Oleic	25%
Palmitic	12%
Stearic	3%

Artichoke oil is one possible source of biodiesel feedstock.
