= Apricot oil =

Vegetable oil

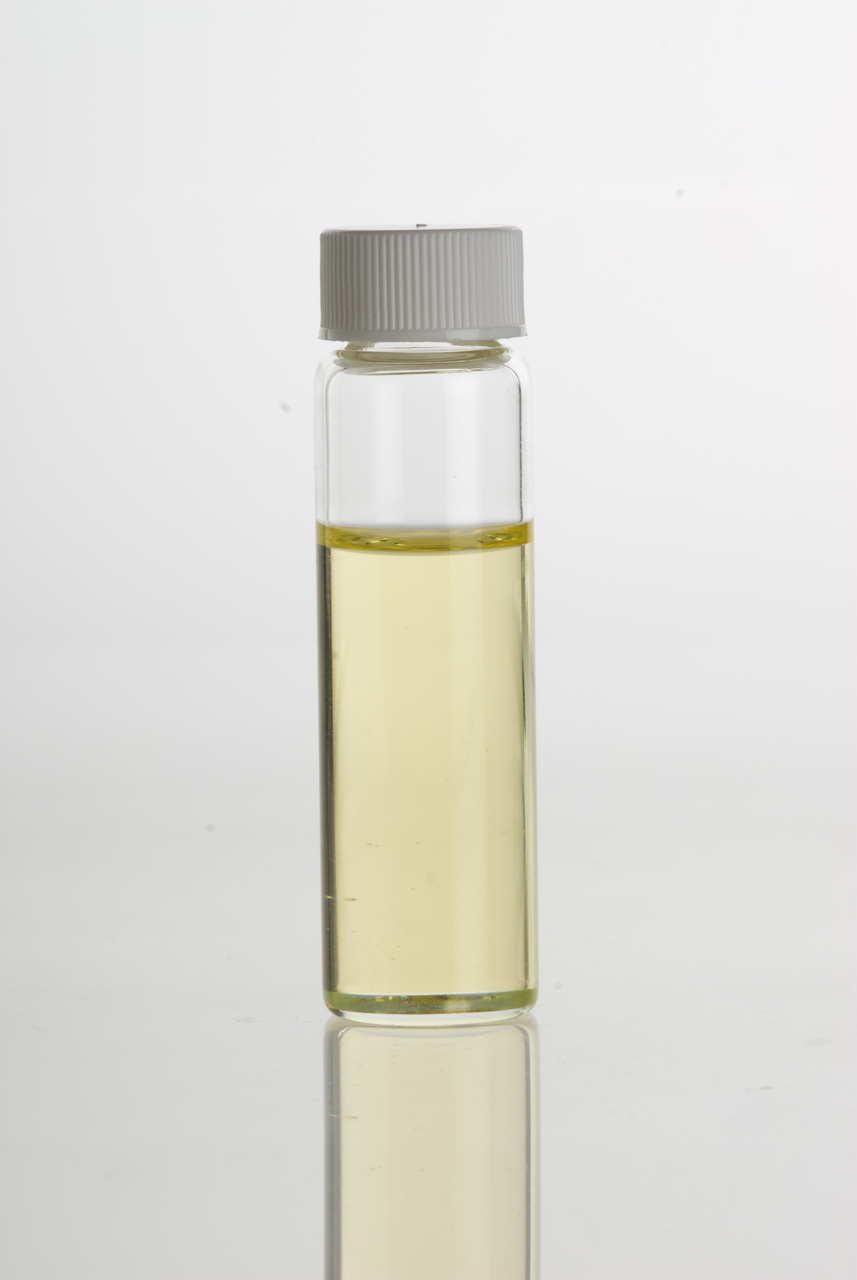
Apricot seed oil in a clear glass vial

Apricot oil or apricot kernel oil is pressed from the kernels of the Prunus armeniaca (apricot). Apricot kernels have an oil content of 40–50%. The oil is similar to almond oil and peach oil, both of which are also extracted from the kernels of the respective fruit.

The seed cake is also used separately to extract an essential oil, which contains amygdalin, a colorless crystalline glucoside.

The oil is chiefly composed of oleic acid and linoleic acid, both of which are unsaturated fats. Palmitic acid, palmitoleic acid, and stearic acid make minor contributions to the overall oil content.

== Vitamin content of apricot kernels ==
The actual vitamin content of apricot oil may vary depending on the production technique. The following vitamins are present in the dry kernel matter:

Thiamine, riboflavin, Niacin, Vitamin C, δ-tocopherol, α-tocopherol.
