= Ram press (food) =

Device or machine commonly used to press items with a mechanical ram

A ram press is a device or machine commonly used to press items with a mechanical ram, such as with a plunger, piston, force pump, or hydraulic ram. In food preparation, there are various kinds of ram presses:

The fruit ram press and cider ram press are both types of fruit presses that extract the juices out of the fruit through pressure. The second makes apple cider.

An oil seed ram press is also known as an oil ram press and it extracts the oil out of oil seeds.
