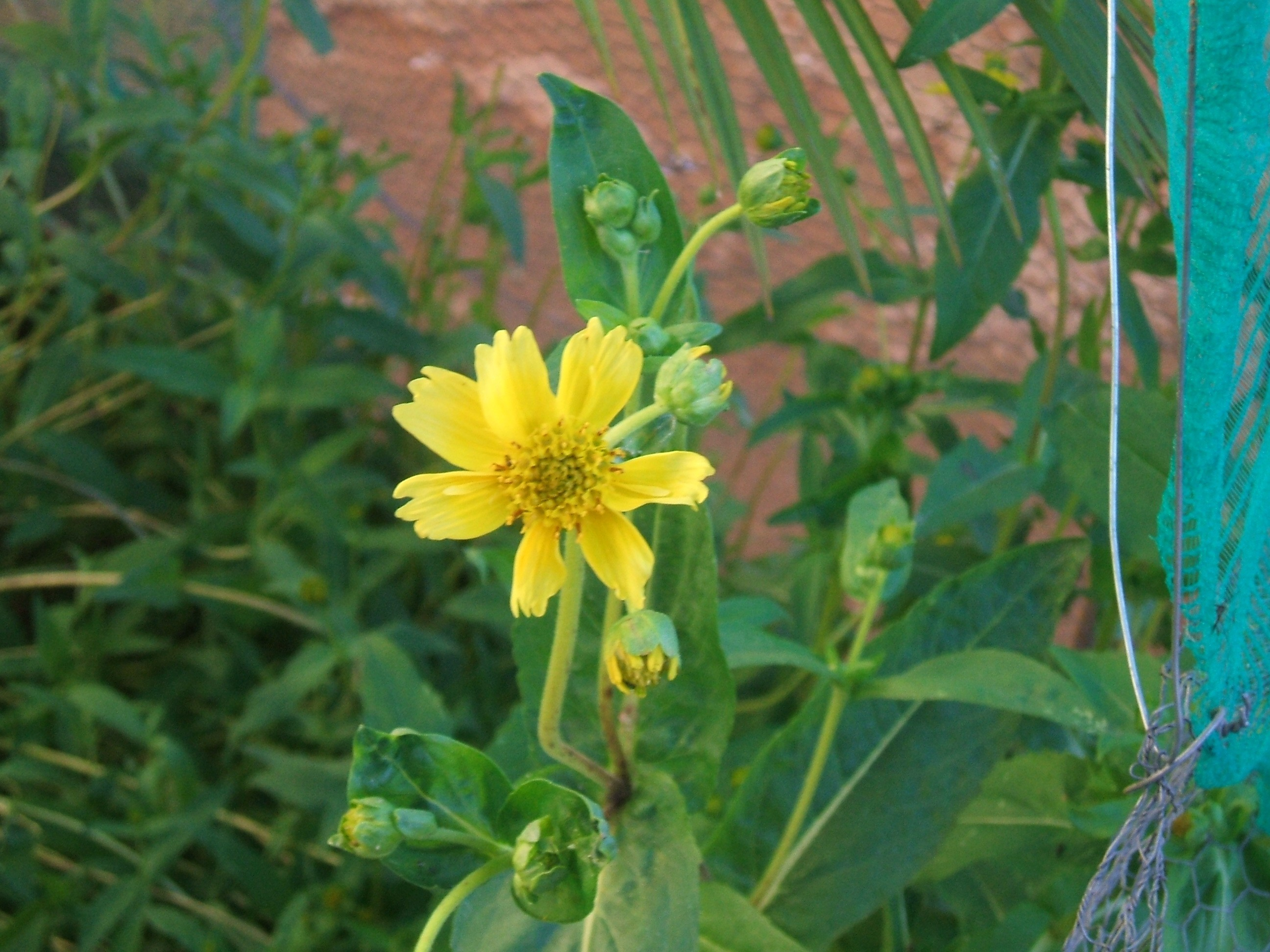
- Guizotia abyssinica flower

Scientific classification
- Kingdom: Plantae
- Clade: Tracheophytes
- Clade: Angiosperms
- Clade: Eudicots
- Clade: Asterids
- Order: Asterales
- Family: Asteraceae
- Genus: Guizotia
- Species: G. abyssinica

Binomial name
- Guizotia abyssinica (L.f.) Cass.

Synonyms
- Synonymy: Anthemis mysorensis herb.madr. ex DC.; Bidens ramtilla Wall. ex DC.; Buphthalmum ramtilla Buch.-Ham. ex Wall.; Guizotia oleifera (DC.) DC.; Jaegeria abyssinica (L.f.) Spreng.; Polymnia abyssinica L.f. 1782; Ramtilla oleifera DC.; Tetragonotheca abyssinica Ledeb.; Verbesina sativa Roxb. ex Sims

= Guizotia abyssinica =

Species of flowering plant

Guizotia abyssinica is an erect, stout, branched annual herb, grown for its edible oil and seed. Its cultivation originated in the Eritrean and Ethiopian Highlands, and has spread to other parts of Ethiopia. Common names include noog/nug (Ethio-Semitic and Eritrean ኑግ nūg or ኒህዩግ nihyug); ramtil or ramtilla; niger or nyger seed (all pronounced /ˈnaɪdʒər/, NY-jər); inga seed; and blackseed. Noug has been described as semi-domesticated, self-incompatible crop with yellow flowering heads and seeds. Recent studies have revealed the regional genetic diversity of some noug populations grown in Ethiopia based on RAPD and AFLP markers.

== Seed ==
Native to Ethiopia, Eritrea and Malawi, niger seeds are also grown in India. Niger seeds resemble sunflower seeds in shape, but are smaller in size and black. It bears a fairly thick, adherent seed coat and can be stored for up to a year without deterioration. Niger seed contains proteins, oil and soluble sugars. Niger seeds are used as bird feed worldwide. Commercial niger seed is grown in Africa, India and other areas of southeast Asia, and the seed is imported around the world as a popular type of birdseed. Before it is imported, however, niger seed is sterilized by intense heat to prevent germination of any additional seeds that may be part of the mix. Treated niger seed may germinate but would typically be stunted, limiting its spread and offering less of a threat to native plants.

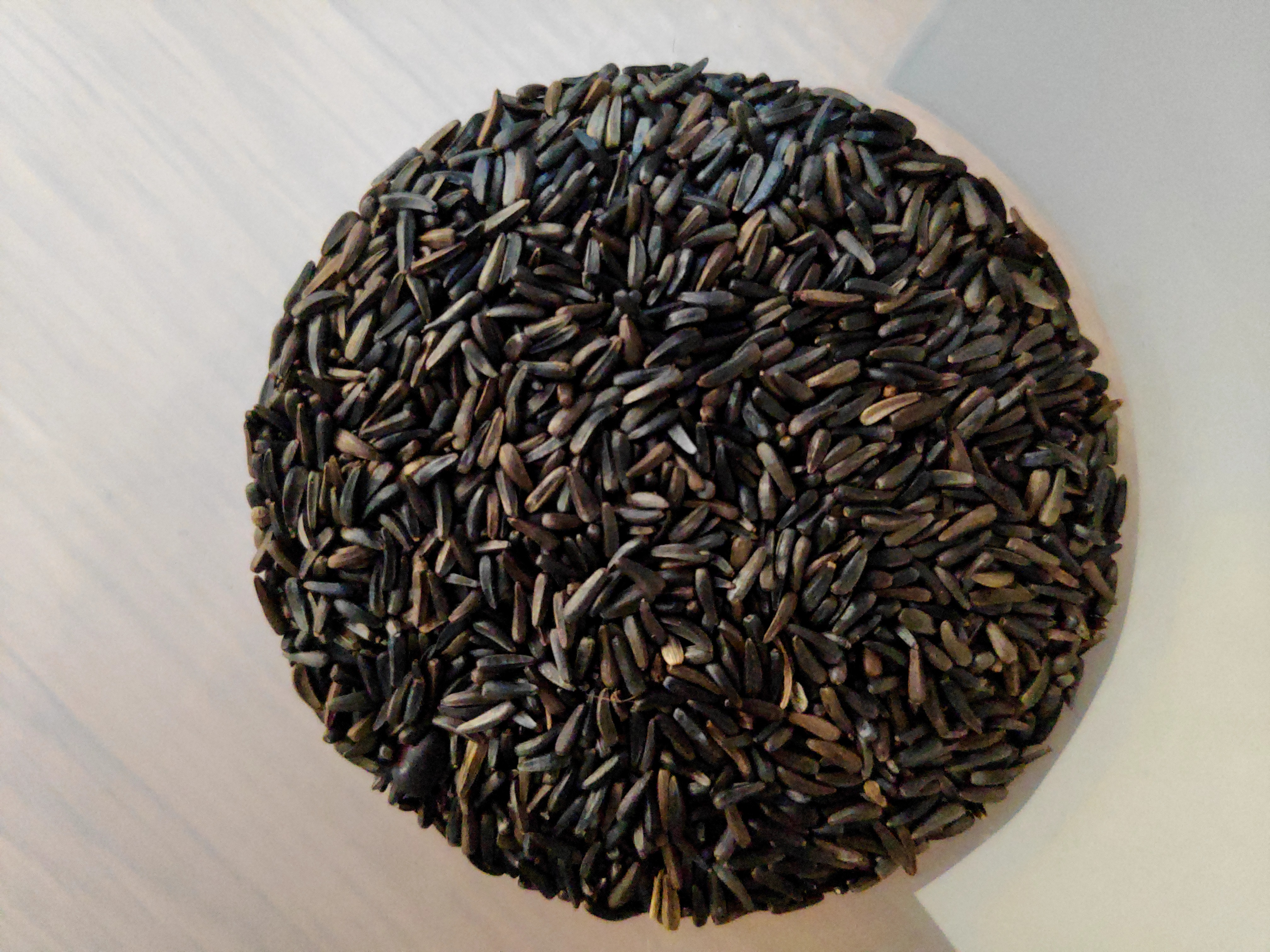
Niger seed

Basic nutritional components of niger seeds

Component	Percentage
Oil	30%–40%
Proteins	10%–25%
Soluble sugars	12%–18%
Crude fiber	10%–20%
Moisture	10%–11%

== Cultivation ==
Requiring moderate rainfall between 1,000 to 1,250 millimetres (39 to 49 in) annually, niger seed needs moist soil to grow properly. Niger should be grown in light black soils or brownish loam with sufficient depth but it also can be grown on well drained heavy soils or rocky laterite soils. It can grow in semi-shade or full sun. The yield of seeds will average 300–400 kilograms per hectare (270–360 lb/acre) under favorable conditions but can produce up to 600 kilograms per hectare (540 lb/acre). It gives a dependable yield even under unfavorable climatic conditions.

The seed, technically a fruit called an achene, is often sold as birdseed as it is a favourite of finches, especially the goldfinch and the greenfinch (Chloris). In the birdseed market, niger is often sold or referred to as thistle seed. This is a misnomer resulting from early marketing of the seed as "thistle" to take advantage of the finches' preference for thistle.

The Wild Bird Feeding Industry (WBFI) has trademarked the name Nyjer "... to eliminate product confusion and the offensive mispronunciation of Niger as well as to promote a positive image for the use of 'Guizotia abyssinica' as a wild bird feed."

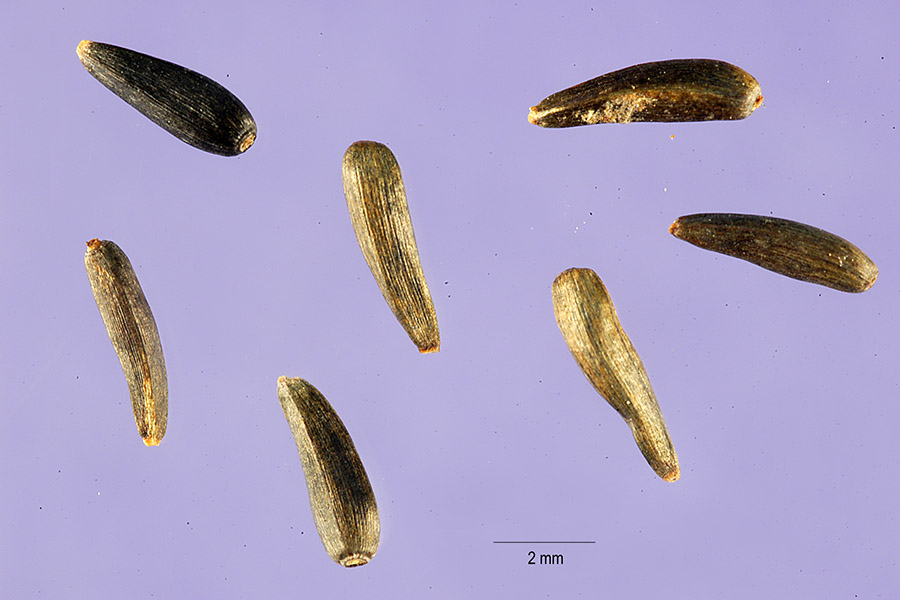
Niger seed

In 1982, the USDA ordered that imported niger seed must be heat sterilized to kill the contaminant dodder seed. This treatment, however, was insufficient to kill seeds of other Federal noxious weeds, including Asphodelus fistulosus (onion weed), Digitaria spp. (includes African couchgrass), Oryza spp. (red rice), Paspalum scrobiculatum (kodo millet), Prosopis spp. (includes mesquites), Solanum viarum (tropical soda apple), Striga spp. (witchweed), and Urochloa panicoides (liver-seed grass). In 2001 a new treatment required that imported niger seed must be heat treated at 120 °C (248 °F) for 15 minutes.

In 2002, the 'EarlyBird' variety of Guizotia abyssinica with a crop maturity of 65 days was developed and adapted to grow in the United States. The 'EarlyBird' variety of Guizotia abyssinica is protected by U.S.D.A. Plant Variety Protection Certificate Number 9900412. A second variety of Guizotia abyssinica submitted to the U.S.D.A. for Plant Variety Protection (Application Number 200500140) called 'Earlybird 50' has a crop maturity of 50 days and is a shorter, more dense plant with a higher yield and is less susceptible to lodging than the 'EarlyBird' variety. Both varieties have short enough maturities to make production feasible in many U.S. growing regions. Guizotia abyssinica is not a Federal noxious weed and is now in commercial agricultural production in the United States often grown as a first or second crop before or after wheat, maize, soybeans, and cucurbits. Niger is self-sterile and requires bees for cross pollination.

== Oil ==
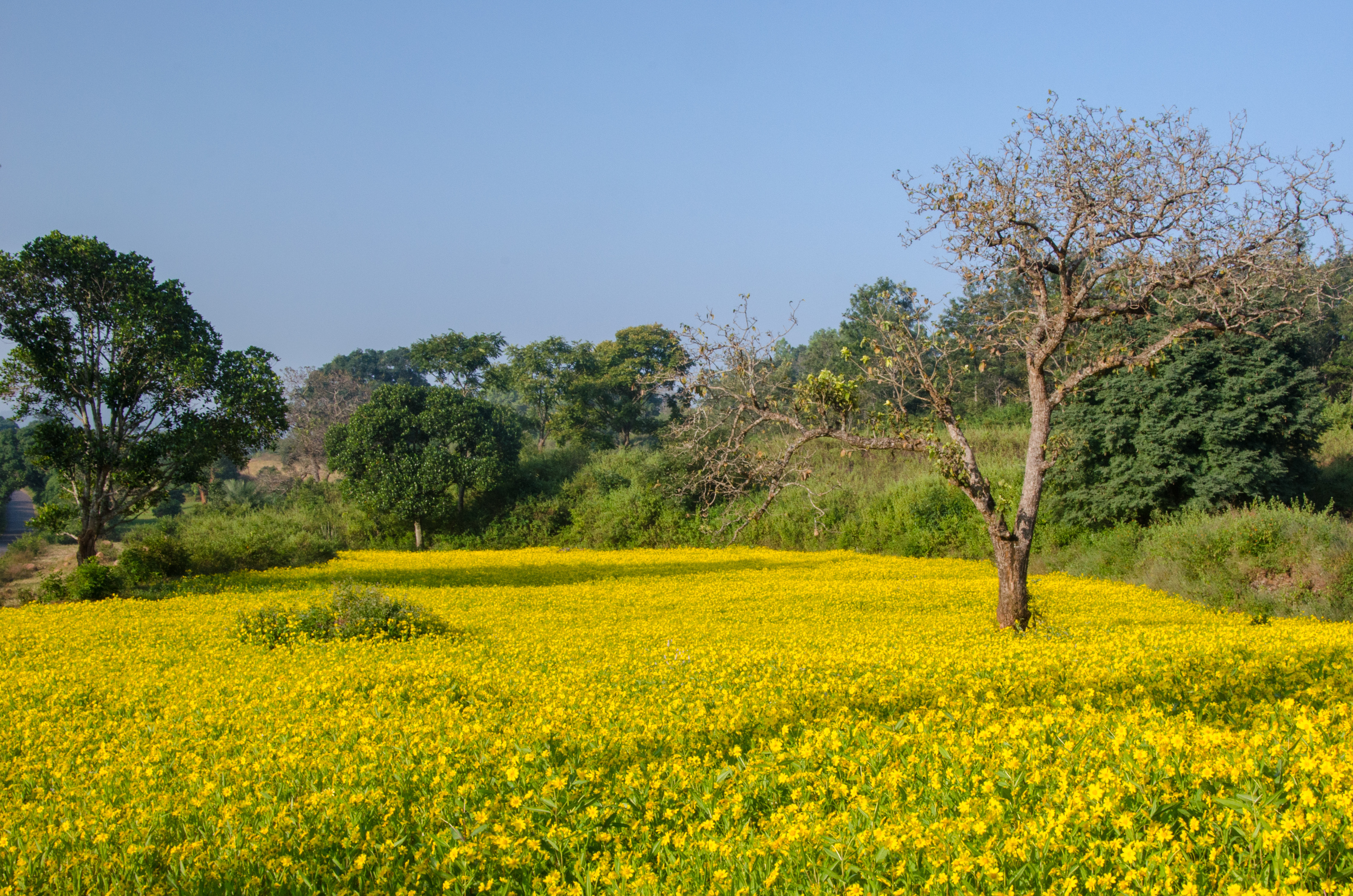
A field soon to be harvested for oil production in Araku Valley, India

Niger seed yields about 30–35% of its weight in oil which is clear, slow-drying, and edible. Niger seed oil is a polyunsaturated semi-drying oil. It has a pale yellow or orange color with a nutty taste and sweet odor. The raw oil has a low acidity and can be used directly for cooking. Normally, it has a poor shelf life and will become rancid when stored for a long period. Its fatty acid composition is similar to sunflower oil and has high content of linoleic acid. It is used as a substitute for olive oil and can be mixed with linseed oil. The presence of linoleic acid varies from 45.0 to 65.0% depending on harvested soil conditions and seed variety. The physical character of oil and its fatty acid composition is furnished in the following tables.

Physical characteristics of oil

Characteristic	Range
Refractive index 40 °C	1.4655–1.4673
Saponification value	187–195
Iodine value	112–129.0
Unsaponifiable matter	0.5–1.0%
Moisture	0.5–0.75%
Bellier turbidity temperature	24.5–27.8 °C
Free fatty acid	0.2–2.0%

Fatty acid composition of niger seed oil

Fatty acid	Percentage
Myristic acid (C14:0)	1.7%–3.4%
Palmitic acid (C16:0)	5.8%–13.0%
Stearic acid (C18:0)	5.0%–7.5%
Oleic acid (C18:1)	13.4%–39.3%
Linoleic acid (C18:2)	45.5%–65.8%

== Culinary and medicinal uses ==
Niger seeds are used for human consumption in the southern parts of India. In Karnataka, Andhra Pradesh and Maharashtra, niger seeds (called valisalu/valasulu in Telugu, uchellu/gurellu in Kannada, and karale in Marathi) are used to make a dry chutney, which is used as an accompaniment with breads such as chapati. They are also used as a spice in some curries. In Ethiopia, an infusion made from roasted and ground niger seeds, sugar and water is used in treating common colds.

== Other uses ==
A paste or gruel made from slightly roasted and ground niger seed, mixed with roasted and ground flaxseeds (Amharic: telbah) and hot water, is traditionally used in Ethiopia in treating leather.

The seed's oil is widely used for industrial purposes such as soap making, paints preparations and preparation of different types of emulsions.

The seed is used as bird food. As the seeds are so small, specialized bird feeders are manufactured for niger seed. In the United Kingdom the seeds attract finches and siskins.

Niger oil cake, which consists of the residues obtained after processing of the seeds to make oil, is rich in protein and is used to feed livestock, particularly in Ethiopia.

Due to its concentration of caffeic acid and other phenolic compounds, the seed extract of Guizotia abyssinica can be incorporated into culture media to be used in differentiating colonies of Cryptococcus sp. from other yeast colonies, given that the former will produce melanic pigments and be darker colored, and the latter won't.
