= Crambe (disambiguation) =

Crambe is a genus of plants

Crambe may also refer to:

- Crambe, North Yorkshire
- Crambeck near Crambe in Yorkshire, famous as having been a Roman encampment
- Crambe (sponge), a genus of demosponges
- Crambe, a genus of about 20 species of annual and perennial flowering plants
  - Crambe abyssinica, an oilseed crop, native to the Mediterranean
  - Crambe cordifolia, syn. Crambe glabrata DC. (greater sea kale, colewort, heartleaf crambe), a species of flowering plant
  - Crambe maritima (common name sea kale, seakale or crambe), a species of halophytic flowering plant in the genus Crambe
- Crambe oil, an inedible seed oil, extracted from the seeds of the Crambe abyssinica
