= Crambe oil =

Seed oil from Crambe abyssinica

Crambe oil is an inedible seed oil, extracted from the seeds of the Crambe abyssinica, a multibranched annual plant that is native to the Ethiopian Highlands also known as Abyssinia. The oil has been shown to consist of 55-60% erucic acid. The Australian Farm Diversification Information Service writes:

Intermediate product derived from high erucic acid oil include: triglycerides; erucamides; amines, behenic acid; erucyl alcohol; behenyl alcohol; wax esters; fatty acids; brassylic acid and pelargonic acid. These products are used to manufacture a multitude of industrial consumer items such as lubricants; heat transfer fluids; surfactants and coatings; cosmetics; polyesters; plastics and nylons.

Erucic acid is traditionally derived from older varieties of rapeseed. Crambe oil is considered to be a possible replacement for rapeseed oil in this capacity. The market for crambe oil is particularly developed in the United States.
