= C22H42O2 =

The molecular formula C_{22}H_{42}O_{2} (molar mass: 338.57 g/mol) may refer to:

- Butyl oleate
- Cetoleic acid
- Erucic acid
