= Anti-scratch coating =

Applied protection for softer materials

Anti-scratch coating is a type of protective coating or film applied to an object's surface for mitigation against scratches. Scratches are small cuts left on a surface following interaction with a harder or sharper object. Anti-scratch coatings provide scratch resistances by containing materials with scratch-resistant properties. Scratch resistant materials within coatings come in the form of additives, fillers, and binders. Besides materials, scratch resistance is impacted by coating formation techniques. Commercially, anti-scratch coatings are used in the automotive, optical, and electronics industries, where functionality or resale value is impaired by scratches. Anti-scratch coatings are of growing importance as traditional scratch-resistant materials like metals and glass are replaced with plastics, which are generally softer and less scratch-resistant.

== Applications ==
=== Automotive ===
Anti-scratch coatings in the automotive industry maintain vehicles' appearance, and prevent damage of the anti-corrosion layer. Automotive anti-scratch coatings are becoming stronger (from 10 newtons to 15 newtons of protection) to counter scratch resistance lost due to the industry's shift from steel to lightweight, but less scratch-resistant plastics and aluminium. Currently, scratch formation is decreased with a combination of primer and clear coat. The primer is often made of polyolefin-resin, while the clear coat typically contains the additives siloxane and erucamide.

=== Optical ===
Scratch-resistant coatings are frequently added to glasses because even minor defects are likely to impair a wearer's vision. Even when a corrective lens is made of scratch-resistant glass, polycarbonate, or CR-39, coatings are still often used. Optical coatings include diamond-like carbon (DLC) and anti-reflective and anti-scratch hybrid coatings. Diamond-like carbon shares diamond's extreme scratch resistance. Anti-reflective and anti-scratch hybrid coatings contain scratch-resistant additives with anti-reflective coating materials.

=== Electronics ===
In the electronics industry, scratch-resistant coatings are applied to electronic screens to prevent primary fingernail scratches. Screens are made of either polycarbonate (the most scratch-resistant plastic) or higher-end glass. Electronics industry anti-scratch coatings often contain the anti-scratch additive siloxane, and the anti-scratch fillers titanium dioxide (TiO_{2}) and silicon dioxide (SiO_{2}). The additives and filters are combined with a fluorocarbon resin. Fluorocarbon resin is an oleophobic material that repels the skin surface lipids that are left on screens as fingerprints.

=== Other uses ===
Anti-scratch coatings are often used on plastic products wherever weather or chemical resistance is required. They also help maintain optical clarity. Examples include optical discs, displays, injection-molded parts, gauges and other instruments, mirrors, signs, protective goggles, and cosmetic packaging. These coatings are usually water-based or solvent-based.

== Anti-scratch coating compositions ==
Scratch-resistant materials are present in anti-scratch coating either as binders, additives, and/or fillers. Binder, additives, and filters together make up an anti-scratch coating's thin-film, a nanometer- to micrometer- thickness layer applied to an object's surface.

=== Binders ===
In anti-scratch coatings, binders are a coatings' glue-like cohesive structure, and provide scratch resistance or/and provide structure for scratch-resistant additives and fillers.

Binders that offer scratch resistances and structure include:

- Ceramic-(Inorganic, non metal-based) binders
- Polysilazanes
- Diamond-like Carbon
- Resin (organic, polymer-based) binders
- epoxy
- polycarbonate
- polyethylene

=== Fillers ===
Scratch-resistant coatings use special scratch-resistant fillers. Fillers are particles that enhance specific functional properties of coatings. Common scratch-resistant fillers include:

- Titanium dioxide (TiO_{2})
- Zirconium dioxide (ZrO_{2})
- Aluminium hydroxide oxide (AlOOH)
- Silicon monoxide (SiO)

=== Additives ===
Anti-scratch coatings use additives with specific scratch-resistant properties. Additives are particles dispersed in a thin film in quantities of less than one percent.

Additives that decrease scratch visibility include:

- Siloxane
- Eruamides (A type of fatty acid used in coatings due to fatty acid amide's scratch-resistant properties)

Additives that lower friction, an important part of scratch resistance, include:

- MoS_{2},
- graphite.
- oleic acid amide

Additives that control for micro-cracking, a micro-sized step in scratch formation, include:

- ZnO (Zinc oxide)
- BaO (Barium oxide)
- PbO (lead dioxide)

== Theory ==
Anti-scratch coatings change the substrate's tribological properties, which are those resulting from surface-surface interaction, as well as its inherent mechanical properties. Changed tribological and mechanical properties impact scratch deformation mechanisms, scratch visibility, friction, and other additional considerations.

=== Impact on deformation mechanisms ===
Scratch-resistant coatings lessen the impacts of scratches three primary deformation mechanisms: plowing, micro-cracking, and ironing.

==== Plowing ====
Plowing is when an indenture breaks a material's surface, causing the dislocation of atoms into weaker atomic planes due to plastic deformation. Anti-scratch coatings contain filter-based materials with high ductility (ability to withstand plastic deformations) to limit plowing. Plastic deformations occur when the atomic bonds holding atomic planes break, causing the planes to dislocate into weaker positions. Control for plowing is important, as every additional plowing event leaves a scratch and greater risk for further damage.

==== Micro cracking ====
Micro-cracking causes microscopic cracks that form on brittle surfaces due to the jerking indentor movement known as stick-slip. Anti-scratch coatings control for micro-cracking by containing either fillers, binders, or additives with high tensile strength. Recently, anti-scratch research is focusing on nano-cracking, the nanotribological version of microcracking by creating nano-specific additives.

==== Ironing ====
Anti-scratch coatings control scratch ironing by either prolonging or preventing elastic deformations. Elastic deformations are non-permanent stretching of atomic bonds occurring before plastic deformation.

Anti-scratch coatings control elastic deformations by decreasing elasticity and increasing ductility. Decreasing elasticity must be balanced, since low elasticity causes micro-cracking.

Scratch resistance can also be increased by prolonging the ironing period with high yield point materials. Yield point is the point a materials change from elastic to plastic deformations. Higher yield point materials decrease permeant plowing, by increasing non-permeant ironing.

=== Friction ===
Scratch resistance coatings create low friction surfaces. Low friction surfaces are smooth. Smooth surfaces are important since rougher surfaces are prone to scratches, as shown by the Archard wear equation.

=== Considerations for plastics ===
Plastics have poor scratch hardness due to plastic's high viscoelasticity (highly viscous and elastic deformations) and low crystallinity. Scratch-resistant coatings applied to plastic substrates improve scratch resistance by creating a surface of non-plastic materials.

=== Decreasing scratch visibility ===
==== Surface topology map showing waviness and lay ====
Scratch visibility is impacted by surface grooving. Grooving surrounding a scratch site changes the angle of reflection (direction of light causing waves). When the angle of reflection is altered by more than 3 percent, scratches become visible. Anti-scratch coatings control scratch visibility by having a low grooving surface. Besides friction, low grooving surfaces depend on the topology (surface) factors of surface texture (lay) and spacing of irregularities (waviness). Topology is controlled with precision during the coating formation process.

== Coating formation ==
Main section coating formation

Coating formation is the process of coating-substrate adhesion(attachment). Anti-scratch coatings are generally applied via spray, dip, spin, roll, or flow coating. Coating formation uses various factors to affect topology-dependent scratch properties. These include additive concentration, coating thickness, and viscosity.

Most coating types can be cleaned with a non-ammonia based glass cleaner and a soft cloth.

== Testing of Scratch Resistance ==
ASTM International, the American Society for Testing and Materials, sets material testing standards for materials, including acnti-scratch coatings. Most scratch-resistant coatings fall under ASTM standard D7027 - 20 (See External links). Standard scratch resistance tests involve scratching coatings with a diamond indentor.

== See also ==
- Anti-reflective coating
- coatings
