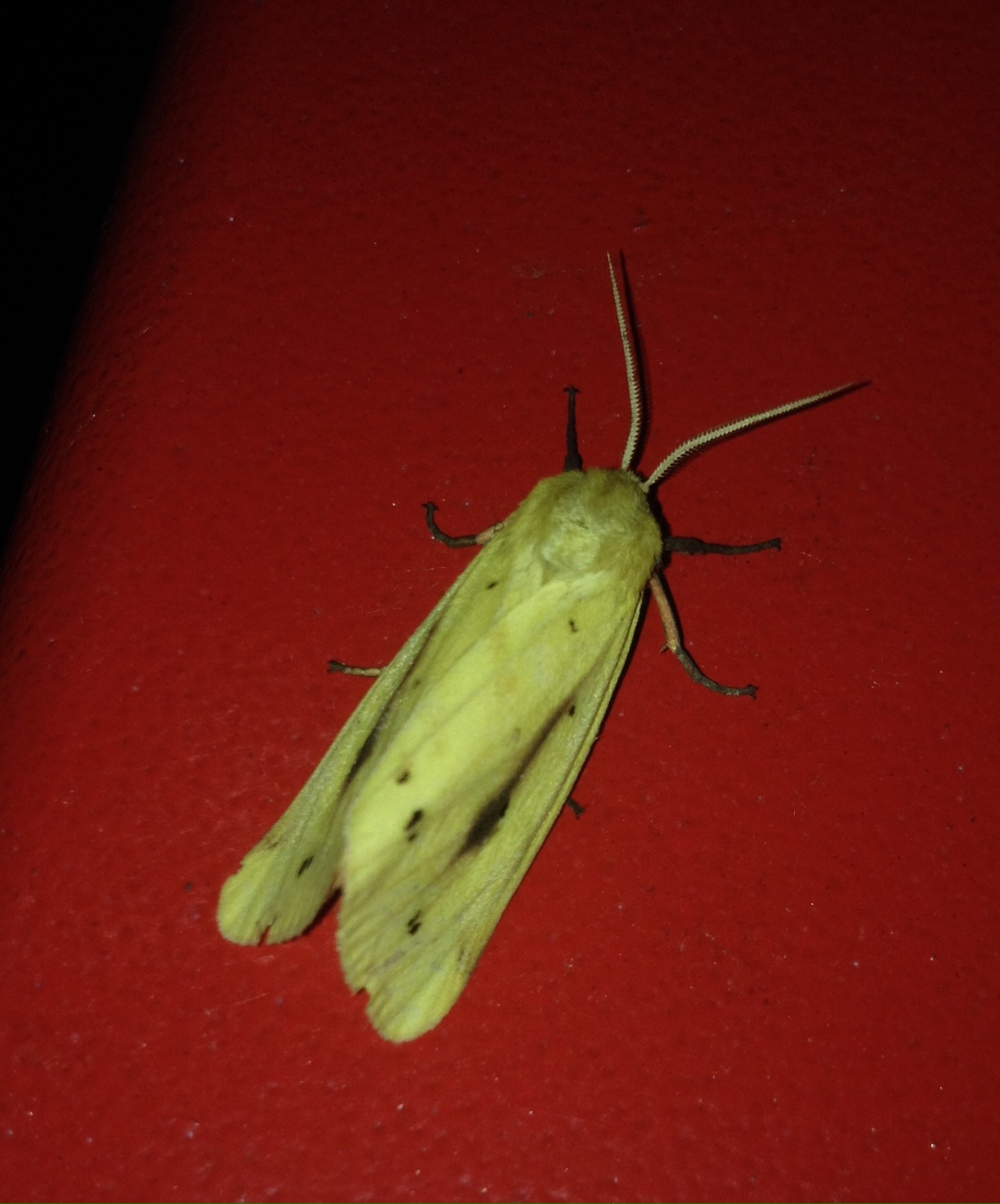

Scientific classification
- Kingdom: Animalia
- Phylum: Arthropoda
- Clade: Pancrustacea
- Class: Insecta
- Order: Lepidoptera
- Superfamily: Noctuoidea
- Family: Erebidae
- Subfamily: Arctiinae
- Genus: Diacrisia
- Species: D. metelkana

Binomial name
- Diacrisia metelkana (Lederer, 1861)

Synonyms
- Rhyparioides metelkana (Lederer, 1861); Chelonia flavida Lederer, 1861; Diacrisia simanensis Miyake, 1909; Diacrisia (Rhyparioides) okinawana Matsumura, 1927; Diacrisia (Rhyparioides) sounkeana Matsumura, 1927; Rhyparioides metelkana occidentalis Daniel, 1939; Rhyparioides metelkana kiangsui Daniel, 1943

= Diacrisia metelkana =

Species of moth

Diacrisia metelkana is a moth in the family Erebidae. It was described by Julius Lederer in 1861. It is found in southern and central Europe, Russia, eastern Asia and Japan.

The wingspan is 38–44 mm. Adults have been recorded on wing in June and July.

The larvae feed on Taraxacum officinale, Euphorbia palustris and Caltha palustris.

The species of the genus Rhyparioides, including this one, were moved to Diacrisia as a result of phylogenetic research published by Rönkä et al. in 2016.
