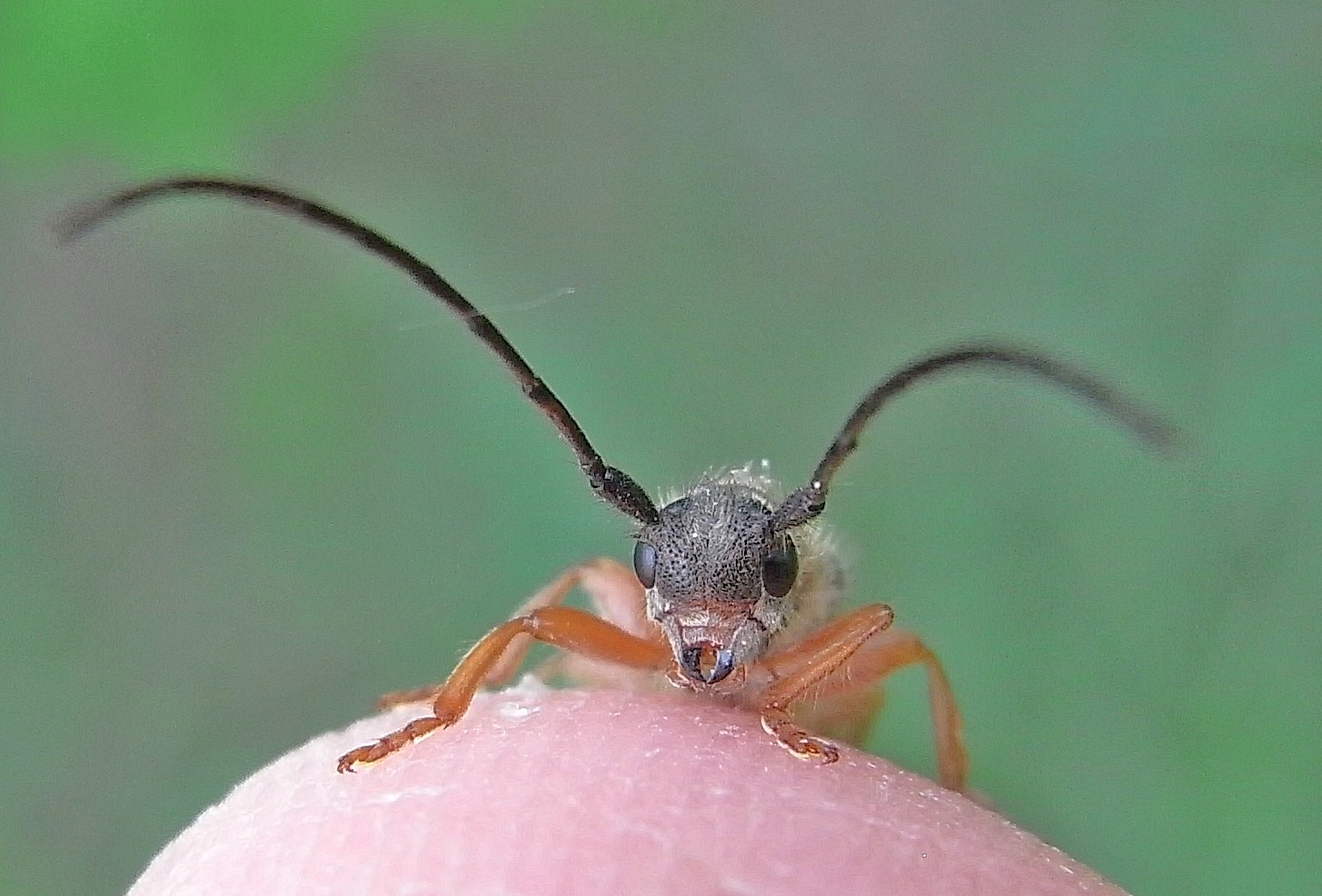

Scientific classification
- Domain: Eukaryota
- Kingdom: Animalia
- Phylum: Arthropoda
- Class: Insecta
- Order: Coleoptera
- Suborder: Polyphaga
- Infraorder: Cucujiformia
- Family: Cerambycidae
- Genus: Oberea
- Species: O. euphorbiae

Binomial name
- Oberea euphorbiae (Germar, 1813)

Synonyms
- Saperda euphorbiae Germar, 1813; Amaurostoma euphorbiae (Germar, 1813)

= Oberea euphorbiae =

Species of beetle

Oberea euphorbiae is a species of beetle in the family Cerambycidae. It was described by Ernst Friedrich Germar in 1813 originally under the genus Saperda. It has a wide distribution in Europe. It feeds on Euphorbia palustris.

Oberea euphorbiae measures between 13 and 19 mm (0.51 and 0.75 in).

== Variety ==
- Oberea euphorbiae var. intermissa Breuning, 1951
- Oberea euphorbiae var. imitans G. Müller, 1948
