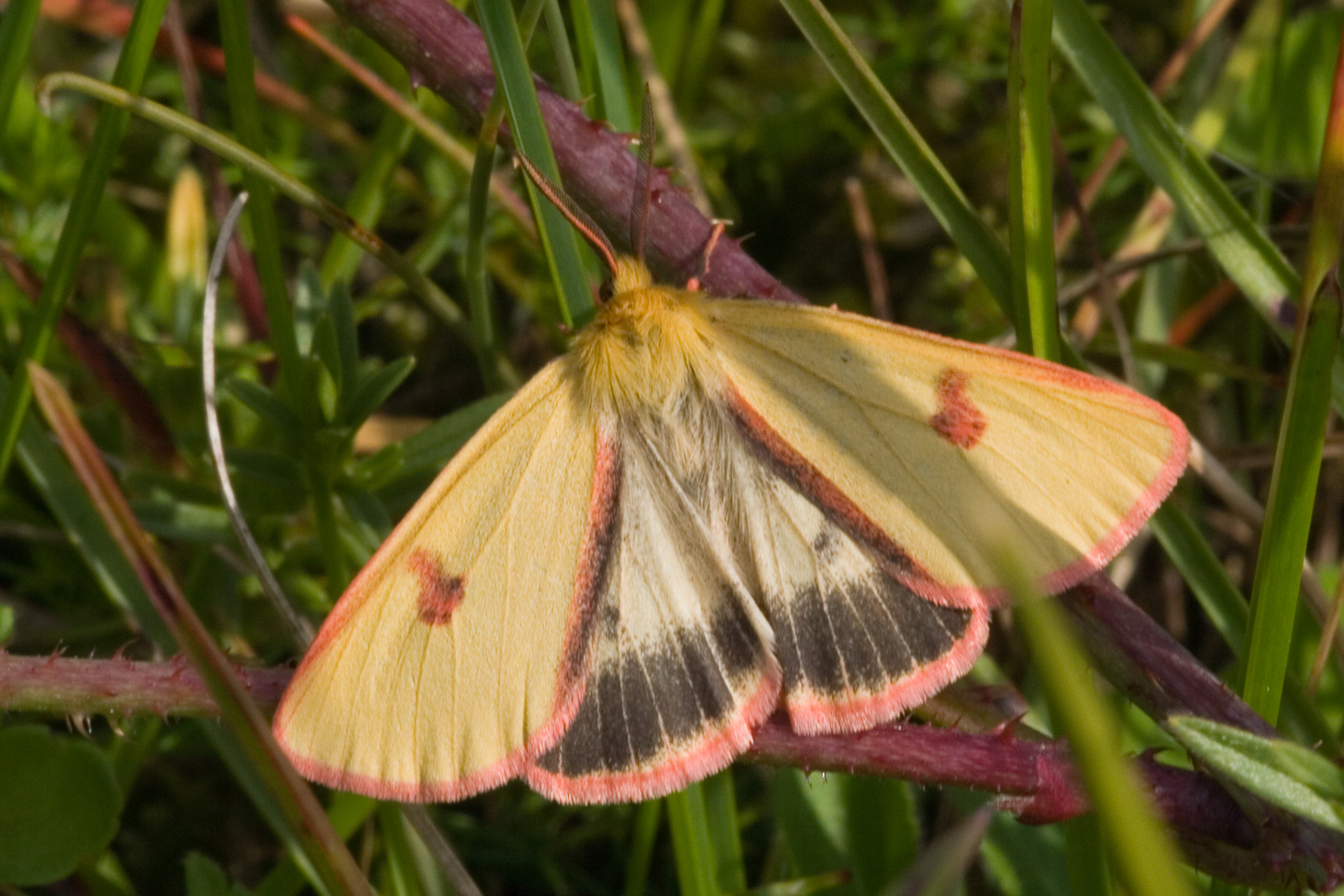

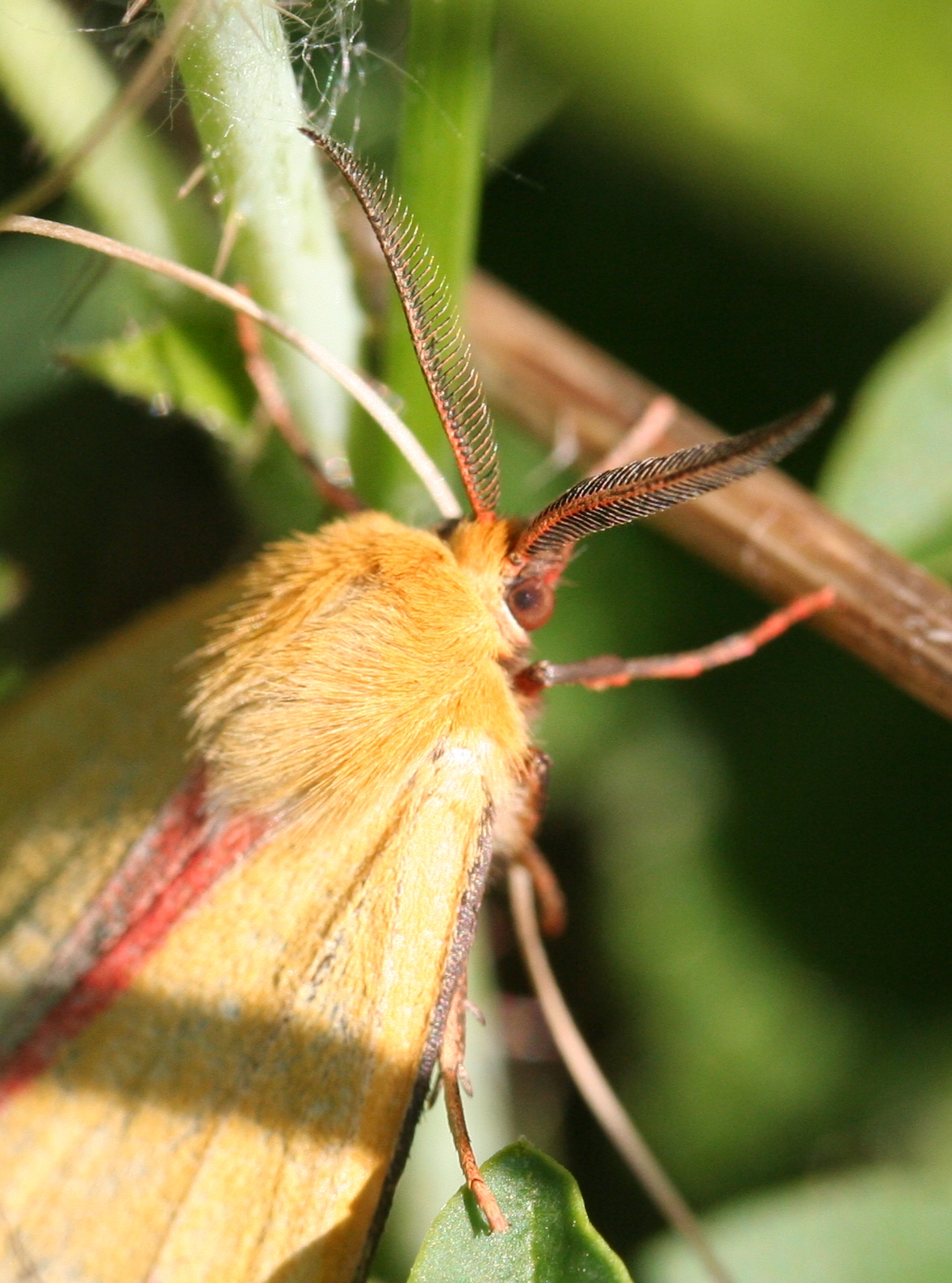

Scientific classification
- Kingdom: Animalia
- Phylum: Arthropoda
- Class: Insecta
- Order: Lepidoptera
- Superfamily: Noctuoidea
- Family: Erebidae
- Subfamily: Arctiinae
- Genus: Diacrisia
- Species: D. sannio

Binomial name
- Diacrisia sannio (Linnaeus, 1758)

= Diacrisia sannio =

Clouded buff

Species of moth

Diacrisia sannio, the clouded buff, is a moth of the family Erebidae. The species was first described by Carl Linnaeus in his 1758 10th edition of Systema Naturae.

== Distribution ==
It is found in the Palearctic realm from Ireland to Siberia. It is not found in North Africa. In the Russian Far East (Amur, Primorye, Sakhalin, Kunashir), eastern China, Korea, and Japan it is replaced by Diacrisia irene.

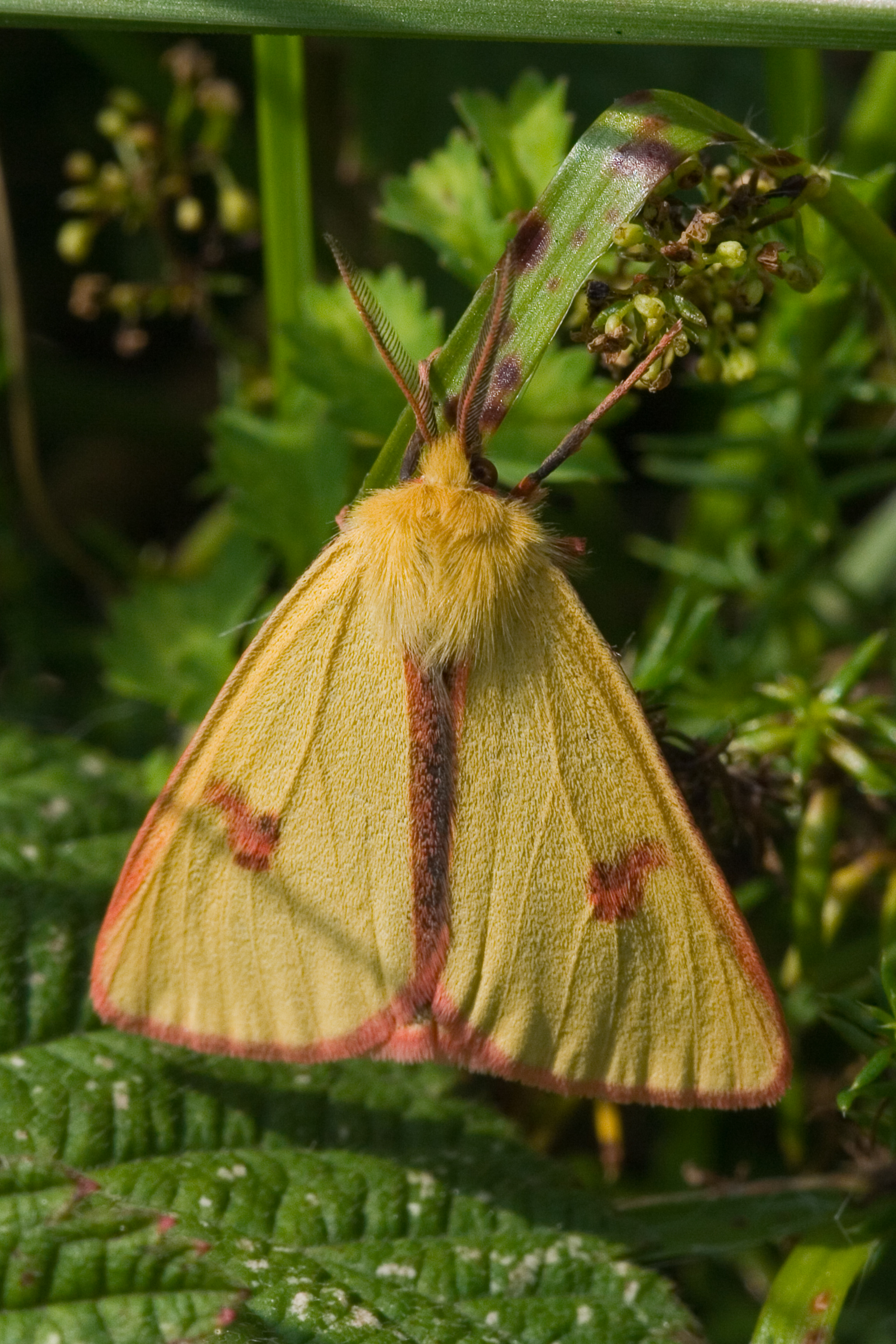

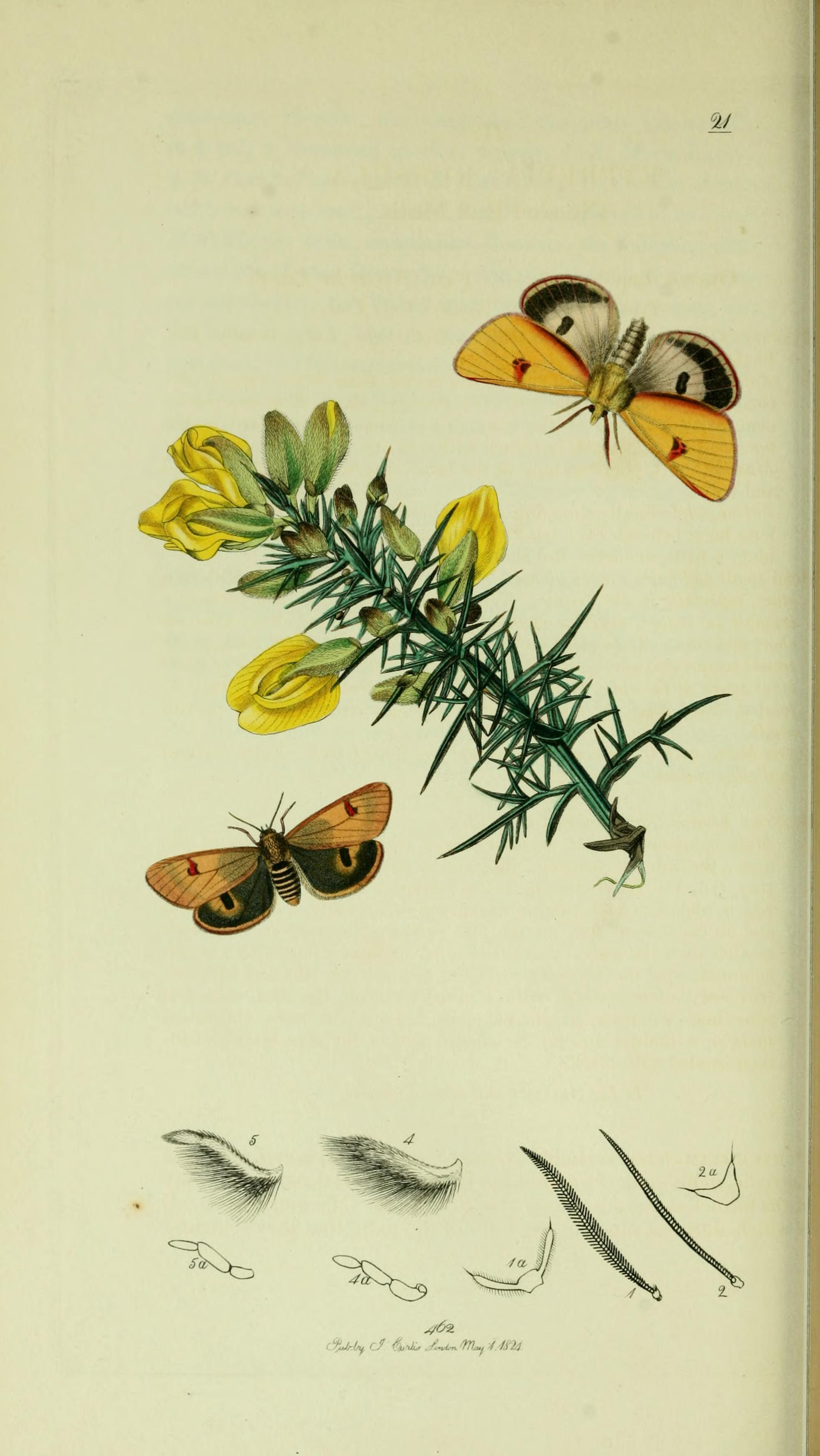
Illustration from John Curtis's British Entomology Volume 5

== Technical description and variation ==
The wingspan is 35–50 mm. The forewing of the male is lemon yellow, and the hindwing is ivory yellow, both wings with a greyish red median spot and pink margin. In the female the body and wings are suffused with brownish red. In pallida Stgr., which occurs constantly in Central Asia and aberratively also in Europe, the black colour is reduced. In irene Butl. (now full species Diacrisia irene Butler, 1881), which occurs in Japan and locally also elsewhere in the Palearctic region, and is regarded by Matsumura as a separate species, the black colour is absent on the hindwing of the male and the median spot on the forewing is generally reduced. In uniformis Stgr. (D. s. mortua (Staudinger, 1887)) from Syr-Darja, the last trace of black and pink has disappeared, so that extreme specimens of this form are quite uniformly pale yellow on both sides of the wings and body. In specimens from Ferghana, the Issyk-kul and the neighbouring countries further east in Central Asia, the red inner margin of the forewing is entirely absent, the black on the hindwing being however present. This is the form mortua Stgr. (D. s. mortua (Staudinger, 1887)). Further eastward, at the Amur, a form occurs with very sharp black markings, and with the ground colour of the hindwing strongly tinged with reddish, amuri Butler, 1881 Stgr.

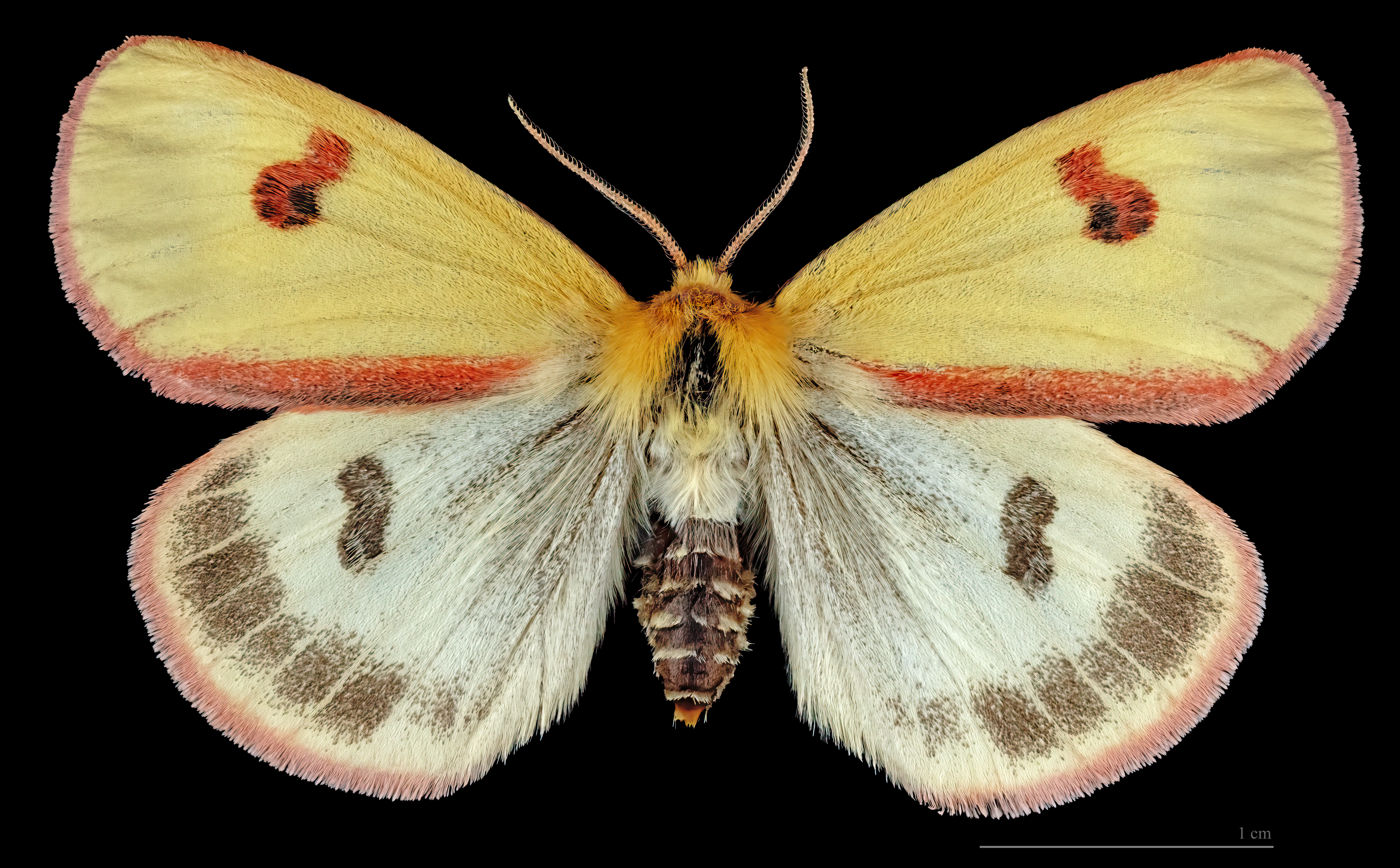
♂

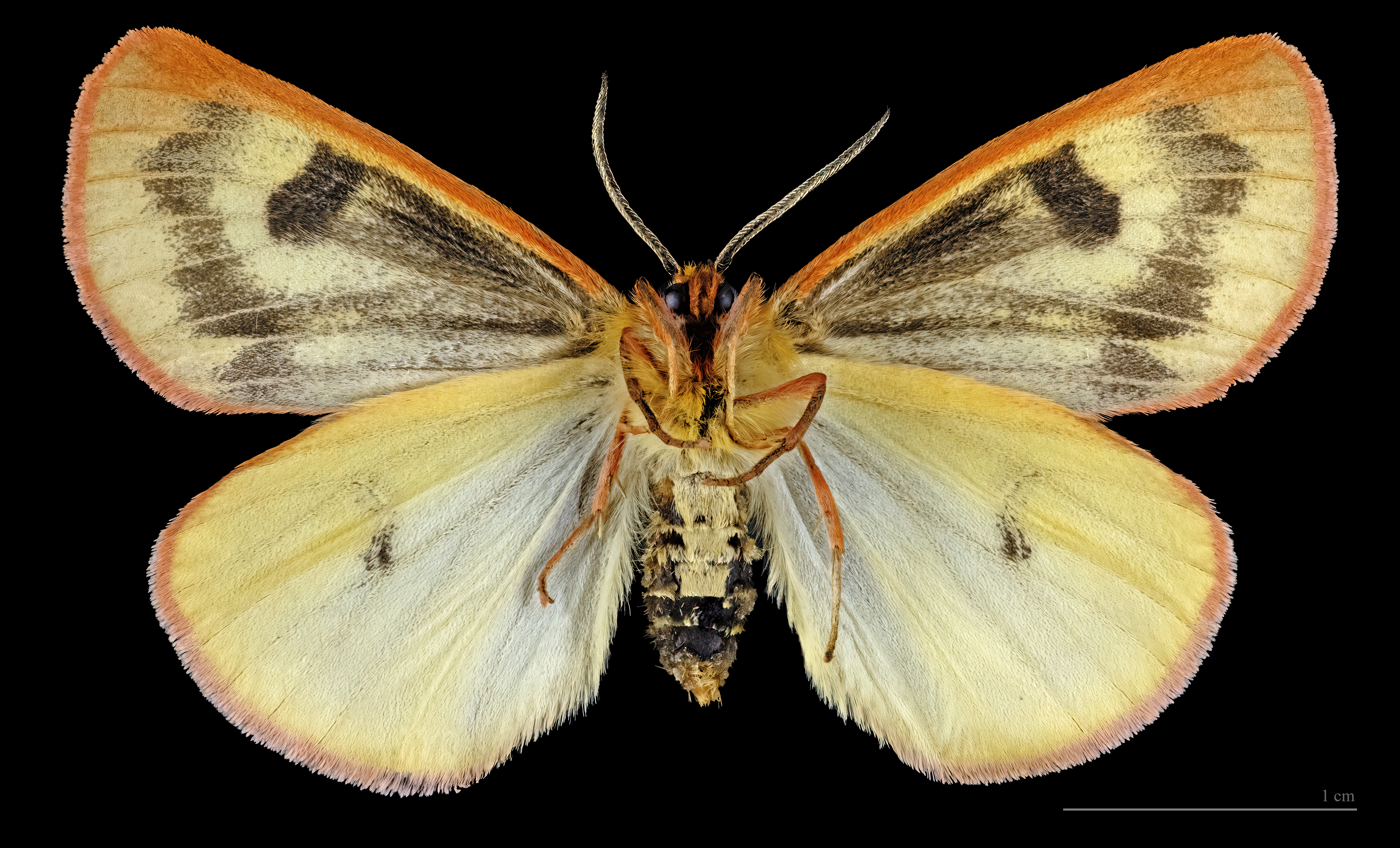
♂ △

== Subspecies ==
- Diacrisia sannio sannio
- Diacrisia sannio armeniaca

== Biology ==
The moth flies June to July depending on the location.

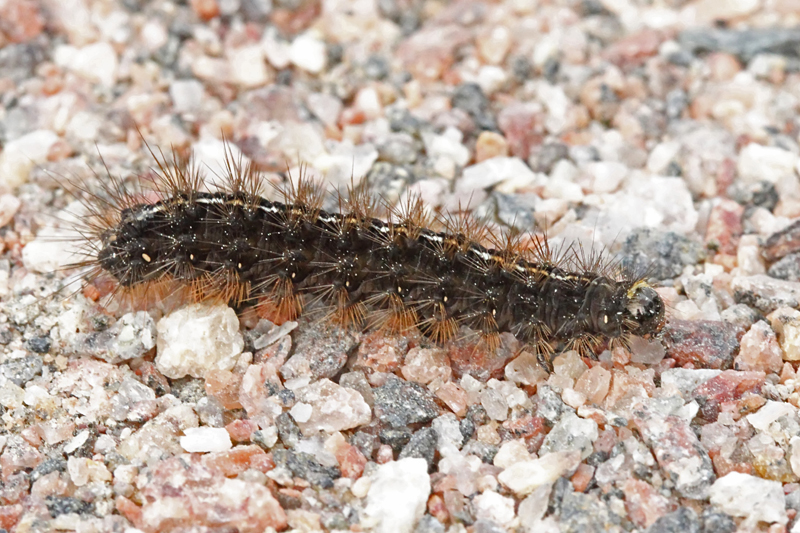
larva

Larva dark brown, with foxy red hairs, light dorsal line spotted with red, and white stigmata. The larvae feed on various shrubs and herbaceous plants. Species in the genera Galium, Plantago, Taraxacum, Epilobium and Urtica.
