= Bioenergy Program =

Discontinued USDA FSA initiative

The Bioenergy Program was an initiative of the United States Department of Agriculture Farm Service Agency. The program started on October 1, 2002, and was terminated on June 30, 2006.

The program made payments to ethanol and biodiesel producers who expand their production capacity from eligible commodities. In the year of the expansion, the program payments help offset the cost of the additional commodity feedstocks (usually corn for ethanol and soybeans for biodiesel) needed for the expansion. In addition to corn and soybeans, also barley, grain sorghum, oats, rice, wheat, sunflower seed, canola, crambe, rapeseed, safflower, sesame seed, flaxseed, mustard seed, and cellulosic crops were defined as eligible commodities if grown on farms for the production of ethanol or biodiesel.

The program was codified into law by the United States 2002 farm bill (P.L. 107–171, Sec. 9010). It was funded through the Commodity Credit Corporation. Spending for the program was capped at $150 million annually between 2002 and 2006. Payments to a single producer were limited by 5% of available funding. The Congressional Budget Office estimated that $204 million total was spent between 2002 and 2006.

The new Bioenergy Program for Advanced Biofuels is planned to be implemented for fiscal year 2009.
