= Filler (materials) =

Particles added to improve its properties

Plastic consumption uses by field

Filler materials are particles added to binders (resin, thermoplastics, cement) to make a composite material. Filler materials improve specific properties or make the product cheaper.

Coarse filler materials such as construction aggregate and rebar are used in the building industry to make plaster, mortar and concrete.

Powdered fillers are mixed in with elastomers and plastics. Worldwide, more than 53 million tons of fillers (with a net worth of ca. US$18 billion) are used every year in the production of paper, plastics, rubber, paints, coatings, adhesives, and sealants. Fillers are produced by more than 700 companies, rank among the world's major raw materials and are contained in a variety of goods for daily consumer needs. The top filler materials used are ground calcium carbonate (GCC), precipitated calcium carbonate (PCC), kaolin, talc, and carbon black.

Filler materials can affect the tensile strength, toughness, heat resistance, color, clarity, etc. This can be utilised to modify or enhance the material properties, or as a way to improve and control the processing characteristics. Another reason to use fillers is to reduce costs by replacing part of the expensive core material with a cheaper filler.

Most of the filler materials used in plastics are mineral or glass based filler materials. Particulates and fibers are the main subgroups of filler materials. Particulates are small particles of filler that are mixed in the matrix where size and aspect ratio are important. Fibers are small circular strands that can be very long and have very high aspect ratios.

Fillers, also known as bulking agents or excipients, are also applied in pharmacy to form tablets. Fillers are a common ingredient of convenience food.

== Types ==
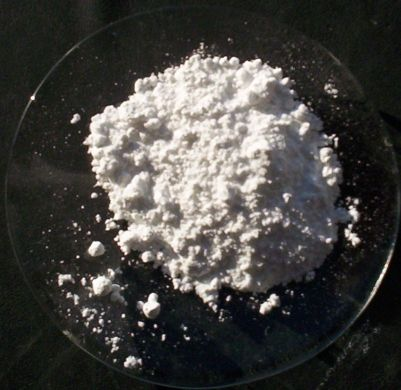
Powder calcium carbonate CaCO_{3} used widely as a filler material.

=== Calcium carbonate (CaCO_{3}) ===
Referred to as "chalk" in the plastic industry, calcium carbonate is derived from limestone and marble. It is used in many applications including PVC's and unsaturated polyesters. As much as 90% CaCO_{3} can be used to make a composite. These additions can improve molding productivity by decreasing the cooling rate. They can also increase the operating temperatures of materials and provide insulation for electrical wiring.

CaCO_{3} is used in filler masterbatch as a base with a large percentage in composition. Calcium carbonate powder accounts for 97% of the composition will bring white/opaque products more whiteness. So manufacturers can reduce the usage of white masterbatch. With a smaller percentage, calcium carbonate powder can be used for color products. In addition, it brings final plastic products a more bright and more glossy surface.

=== Kaolin ===
Kaolin is mainly used in plastics for its anti-blocking characteristics as well as an infrared absorber in laser marking. It increases impact strength and heat resistance. Metakolinite is used to stabilize PVC. Kaolin has also been shown to increase the abrasion resistance and can replace carbon black as a filler material and improve the flow properties of glass-reinforced substances.

=== Magnesium hydroxide (talc) ===
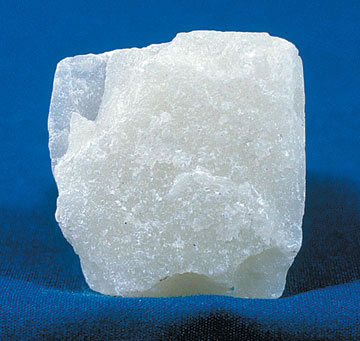
Block of talc.

Talc, a soft mineral and generally more expensive than calcium carbonate. It is derived from layering sheets of magnesium hydroxide with silica. In the plastic industry, it is used for packaging and food applications due to its long-term thermal stability.

=== Wollastonite (CaSiO_{3}) ===
Wollastonite has an acicular structure with a relatively high specific gravity and high hardness. This filler can improve moisture content, wear resistance, thermal stability, and high dielectric strength. Wollastonite competes with platy filler substances like mica and talc and also can be used to replace glass fibers when creating thermoplastics and thermosets.

=== Glass ===
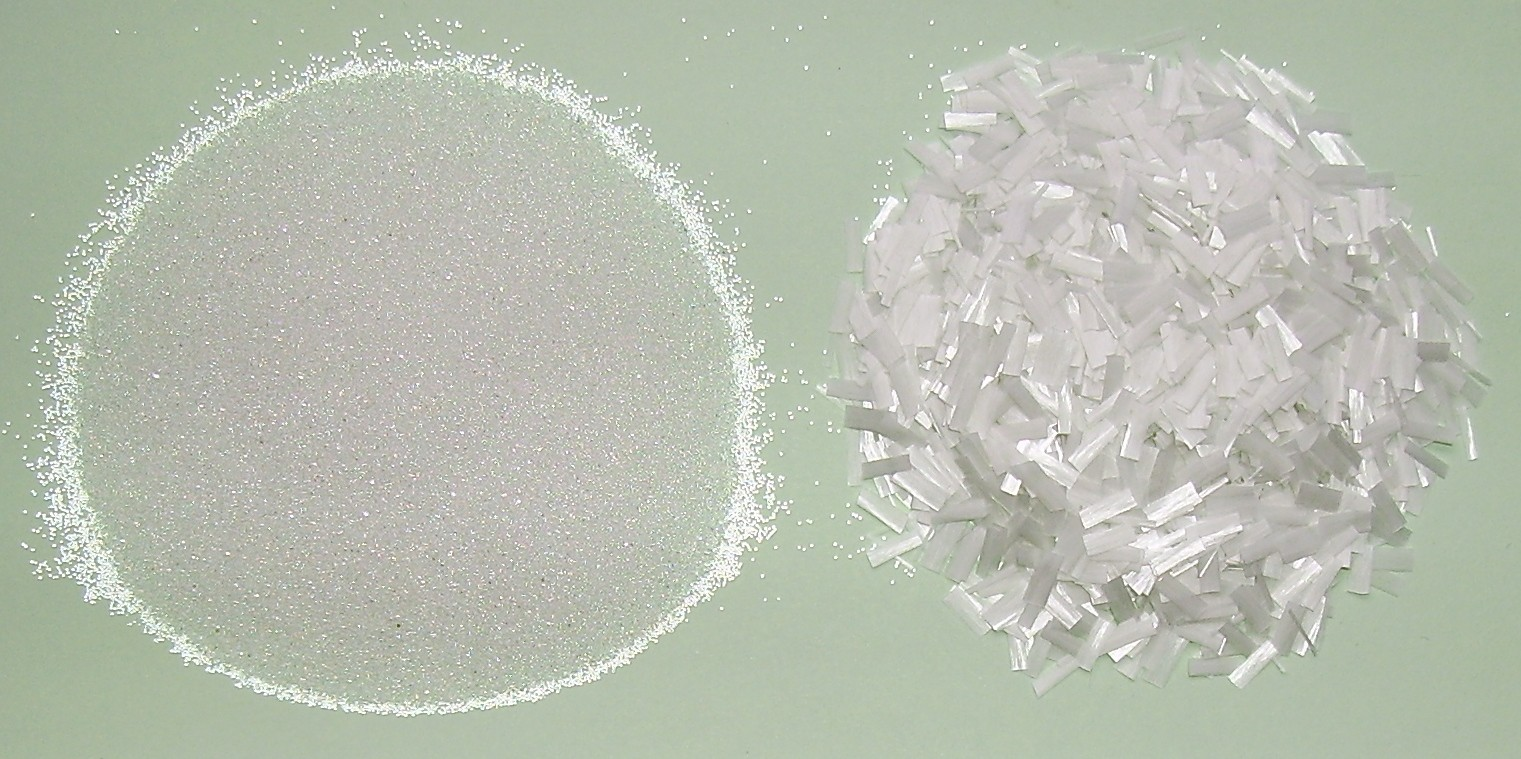
Glass microsphere filler (left) and fiber fillers (right)

Glass filler materials come in a few diverse forms: glass beads, short glass fibers, and long glass fibers. in plastics by tonnage. Glass fibers are used to increase the mechanical properties of the thermoplastic or thermoset such as flexural modulus and tensile strength, There is normally not an economic benefit for adding glass as a filler material. Some disadvantages of having glass in the matrix include low surface quality, high viscosity when melted, poor weldability, and warpage. The addition of glass beads will help with oil absorption and chemical resistance.

=== Fly ashes ===
Coal and shale oil fly ashes have been used as a filler for thermoplastics that could be used for injection molding applications.

=== Nanofillers ===
Nanofiller have a particle size of less than 100 nanometres. They have a high aspect ratio and are mainly used as scratch resistant and fire-resistant fillers. Nanofillers can be broken out into three groups nanoplates, nanofibers, and nanoparticles. Nanoparticles are more widely used than nanoplates and nanofibers but nanoplates are starting to become more widely used. Nanoplates are like conventional platy fillers like talc and mica except the thickness is much smaller. The advantages of adding nanofillers include creating a gas barrier and their flame-retardant properties.

=== Polymer foam beads ===
Polymer Foam Beads can have a bulk density as low as 0.011 g/cc and range in size from 45 microns to over 8 mm. Common drawbacks to using Polymer Foam Beads in formulated systems include static, temperature, and chemical resistance limitations and difficulty achieving a homogenous blend within a formulated system due to their extremely low bulk density. However, these limitations can be mostly if not entirely overcome through the use of formulation modifications, additives, and other surface treatments. Despite these potential challenges, Polymer Foam Beads can be added to formulated systems when weight or cost savings in a finished good are required.

=== Masonry filler ===
Masonry filler is really a composite material named filler as it is used to repair cracks and holes in walls. It is typically made of cement and hydrated lime with fine aggregate as filler material. Manufacturers include Toupret.

=== Natural polymers ===
A variety of natural polymers can be applied as filler. Known examples are cellulose fibres, wood flour and fibres, flax, cotton, sisal and starch.

=== Other fillers ===
Concrete filler materials are called construction aggregate and include gravel, stone, sand, and rebar. Gravel, stone, and sand are used to reduce the cost of concrete. Rebars are used to strengthen the concrete.

Table Of Filler Materials and Physical Properties
| Filler Type | Density (g/cm^{3}) | Mohs Hardness | Mean Size (Microns) | Aspect Ratio/Shape |
|---|---|---|---|---|
| Calcium Carbonate | 2.7 | 3-4 | 0.02-30 | 1-3 Blocky |
| Talc | 2.7-2.8 | 1 | 0.5-20 | 5-40 Plate |
| Wollastonite | 2.9 | 4.5 | 1-500 | 5-30 Fiber |
| Mica | 2.8-2.9 | 2.5-4 | 5-1000 | 20-100 Plate |
| Kaolin | 2.6 | 2 | 0.2-8 | 10-30 Plate |
| Silica (Precipitated) | 1.9-2.1 | 5.5 | 0.005-0.1 | ~1 Round |
| Carbon Black | 1.7-1.9 | 2-3 | 0.014-0.25 | ~1 Round |
| Dolomite | 2.85 | 3.5-4 | 1-30 | ~1 Round |
| Barium Sulfate | 4.0-4.5 | 3-3.5 | 0.1-30 | ~1 Round |
| ATH Al(OH)_{3} | 2.42 | 2.5-3 | 5-80 | 1-10 Plate |
| MDH Mg(OH)_{2} | 2.4 | 2.5-3 | 0.5-8 | 1-10 Plate |
| Diatomaceous earth | 2-2.5 | 5.5-6 | 4-30 | 2-10 Disc |
| Magnetite/Hematite | 5.2 | 5.5-6 | 1-50 | ~1 Blocky |
| Halloysite | 2.54 | 2.5 | 1-20 | 5-20 Tube |
| Zinc Oxide | 5.6 | 4.5 | 0.05-10 | 1 Round |
| Titanium Dioxide | 4.23 | 6 | 0.1-10 | 1 Round |

== Mechanical properties ==
=== Tensile strength ===
Tensile strength is the most used method to evaluate filler materials. The tensile strength of the composite can be calculated using the equation

σ_{c}= σ_{p}(1-aΦ^{b}_{f} +cΦ_{f}^{d})

where

σ_{c} = tensile strength of composite
σ_{p} = tensile strength of polymer matrix
Φ_{f} = volume fraction of filler
a, b, c, d are constants depending on the type of filler. "a" relates to stress concentration and is based on adhesion characteristics of the filler material. "b" is normally 0.67. c and d are constants that are inversely related to particle size.

=== Elastic modulus ===
The elastic modulus (Young's modulus) of a filled polymer can be found using the equation below:

E = E_{0} (1 + 2.5Φ + 14.1Φ^{2})

where:

E_{0} = Modulus of unfilled resin or binder
Φ = Filler concentration

Polymers with smaller additions of filler follow this equation closely. In general addition of filler materials will increase the modulus. The additions of calcium carbonate and talc will increase the elastic modulus, while the addition of elastic filler materials can reduce the value slightly. Filler materials increase the modulus due to their rigidity or stiffness and good adhesion with the polymeric matrix.

=== Impact resistance (toughness) ===
In general fillers will increase impact resistance. The contributing factors that improve impact resistance is particle size, particle shape and particle rigidity. Fibers improve impact resistance the most due to their large aspect ratio. Low hardness fillers will decrease impact strength. Particle size, within a specific range can increase the impact strengths based on the filler material.

=== Wear resistance ===
The wear volume (W_{s}) for plastic materials can be calculated:

W_{s} = KμPDW/(EI_{s})

where:

K = Proportionality constant
P = force
E = Modulus
D = Sliding distance
W = load
I_{s}= Interlaminar shear strength

Matrix and filler both contribute to wear resistance. In general a filler is selected to decrease the friction coefficient of the material. Particle size and shape are contributing factors. Smaller particle size increase wear resistance because they cause less debris. silica, alumina, molybdenum disulfide, and graphite powder are common fillers that improve wear resistance.

=== Fatigue resistance ===
Filler can have a negative or positive effect on fatigue resistance depending on the filler type and shape. In general fillers create small discontinuities in the matrix. This can contribute to crack initiation point. If the filler is brittle fatigue resistance will be low, whereas if the filler is very ductile the composite will be fatigue resistant. Adhesion is also an important factor influencing fatigue resistance. If stress is higher than the particles adhesion a crack will form/propagate. Fiber ends are areas where cracks initiate most often due to the high stress on fiber ends with lower adhesion. Talc is a filler that can be used to increase fatigue resistance.

=== Thermal deformation ===
Filler materials have a large influence on thermal deformation in crystalline polymers. Amorphous polymers are negligibly affected by filler material. Glass fiber additions are used the most to deflect the most heat. Carbon fibers have been shown to do better than glass in some base materials. In general fibrous materials are better at deflecting heat than particle fillers.

=== Creep ===
Creep resistance is heavily impacted by filler materials. The equation below shows the creep strain of a filled material:

ε_{c}(t)/ε_{m}(t) = E_{m}/E_{c}

where:

ε_{c}(t) = is strain of filled polymer
ε_{m}(t) = is strain of matrix or unfilled polymer
E_{m} = is Young's Modulus of matrix
E_{c} =is the Young's Modulus of filled polymer

The better the filler bonds with the matrix the better creep resistance will be. Many interactions will have a positive influence. Glass beads and fibers both have been shown to improve creep resistance in some materials. Aluminum oxide also has a positive effect on creep resistance. Water absorption will decrease the creep resistance of a filled material.

== Weldability of plastic fillers ==
Additions of filler materials can drastically affect the weldability of the plastic. This also depends on the type of welding process used. For ultrasonic welding, fillers like calcium carbonate and kaolin can increase the resin's ability to transmit ultrasonic waves. For electromagnetic welding and hot plate welding additions of talc and glass will reduce the weld strength by as much as 32%. The strength of the plastic after welding would decrease with an increasing amount of fillers in the matrix compared to the bulk material. Use of abrasive fillers can affect the tool used for welding. Abrasive fillers will degrade the welding tools faster, for example, the surface of the ultrasonic horn in contact with the plastic. The best way to test the weldability of filler material is to compare weld strength to resin strength. This can be hard to do since many filler materials contain different level of additives that change the mechanical behavior.

== Applications of filler in plastic industry ==
Filler is widely used in the production process of plastic products. Filler is used to changing the properties of the original plastic. By using plastic filler, manufacturers can save production costs as well as raw materials.

Undeniably the importance of filler masterbatch in improving the physical properties of plastics, especially minimizing cost and production efficiency. With the advantage of price and stability, plastic filler supports the production of:

- Blow molding
- Blown film & lamination
- Extrusion (pipe, sheet)
- Injection Molding
- Nonwoven fabric
- Raffia
- Thermoforming

== See also ==
- Adulterant
