= Diacrisia echo =

Scientific classification
- Domain: Eukaryota
- Kingdom: Animalia
- Phylum: Arthropoda
- Class: Insecta
- Order: Lepidoptera
- Superfamily: Noctuoidea
- Family: Erebidae
- Subfamily: Arctiinae
- Genus: Diacrisia
- Species: D. echo

Binomial name
- Diacrisia echo Rothschild, 1910

Species of moth

Diacrisia echo is a moth of the family Erebidae. It was described by Walter Rothschild in 1910. It is found in Asia.
