= Diacrisia nebulosa =

Scientific classification
- Kingdom: Animalia
- Phylum: Arthropoda
- Class: Insecta
- Order: Lepidoptera
- Superfamily: Noctuoidea
- Family: Erebidae
- Subfamily: Arctiinae
- Genus: Diacrisia
- Species: D. nebulosa

Binomial name
- Diacrisia nebulosa Butler, 1877

Synonyms
- Rhyparioides nebulosa (Butler, 1881); Rhyparioides simplicior Butler, 1881

Species of moth

Diacrisia nebulosa is a moth in the family Erebidae. It was described by Arthur Gardiner Butler in 1877. It is found in the Russian Far East (southern Primorye, Kunashir), China (Dunbei, Inner Mongolia), Japan and possibly Korea.

The species of the genus Rhyparioides, including this one, were moved to Diacrisia as a result of phylogenetic research published by Rönkä et al. in 2016.
