= Diacrisia subvaria =

Scientific classification
- Kingdom: Animalia
- Phylum: Arthropoda
- Class: Insecta
- Order: Lepidoptera
- Superfamily: Noctuoidea
- Family: Erebidae
- Subfamily: Arctiinae
- Genus: Diacrisia
- Species: D. subvaria

Binomial name
- Diacrisia subvaria Walker, 1855

Synonyms
- Rhyparioides subvaria (Walker, 1855); Diacrisia flavidior Oberthür, 1911

Species of moth

Diacrisia subvaria is a moth in the family Erebidae.

This species, along with the others of the genus Rhyparioides, was moved to Diacrisia as a result of phylogenetic research published by Rönkä et al. in 2016.

== Identification ==
It was described by Francis Walker in 1855.

== Habitat ==
It is found in China (Sichuan, Hubei, Jiangxi, Hunan, Zhejiang, Fujian, Guizhou, Guangdong, Hong Kong).

It is also found in Korea and Japan (Tsushima).
