= Diacrisia aurapsa =

Scientific classification
- Domain: Eukaryota
- Kingdom: Animalia
- Phylum: Arthropoda
- Class: Insecta
- Order: Lepidoptera
- Superfamily: Noctuoidea
- Family: Erebidae
- Subfamily: Arctiinae
- Genus: Diacrisia
- Species: D. aurapsa

Binomial name
- Diacrisia aurapsa C. Swinhoe, 1905

Synonyms
- Hollowayana aurapsa (C. Swinhoe, 1905)

Species of moth

Diacrisia aurapsa is a moth of the family Erebidae. It was described by Robert Swinhoe in 1905. It is found on Saparua in Indonesia.
