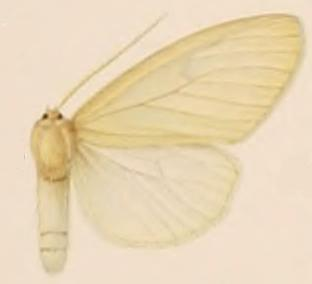

Scientific classification
- Domain: Eukaryota
- Kingdom: Animalia
- Phylum: Arthropoda
- Class: Insecta
- Order: Lepidoptera
- Superfamily: Noctuoidea
- Family: Erebidae
- Subfamily: Arctiinae
- Genus: Diacrisia
- Species: D. porthesioides

Binomial name
- Diacrisia porthesioides Rothschild, 1910

= Diacrisia porthesioides =

Species of moth

"Diacrisia" porthesioides is a moth of the family Erebidae. It is found in Sikkim.
