= Diacrisia amurensis =

Scientific classification
- Kingdom: Animalia
- Phylum: Arthropoda
- Class: Insecta
- Order: Lepidoptera
- Superfamily: Noctuoidea
- Family: Erebidae
- Subfamily: Arctiinae
- Genus: Diacrisia
- Species: D. amurensis

Binomial name
- Diacrisia amurensis (Bremer, 1861)

Synonyms
- Rhyparioides amurensis (Bremer, 1861); Chelonia rubescens amurensis Bremer, 1861; Rhyparioides amurensis meridei Daniel, 1943

Species of moth

Diacrisia amurensis is a moth in the family Erebidae. It was described by Otto Vasilievich Bremer in 1861. It is found in the Russian Far East (Amur basin, Primorye), China, Korea and Japan.

The species of the genus Rhyparioides, including this one, were moved to Diacrisia as a result of phylogenetic research published by Rönkä et al. in 2016.

== Subspecies ==
- Diacrisia amurensis amurensis
- Diacrisia amurensis nipponensis Kishida & Inomata, 1981
