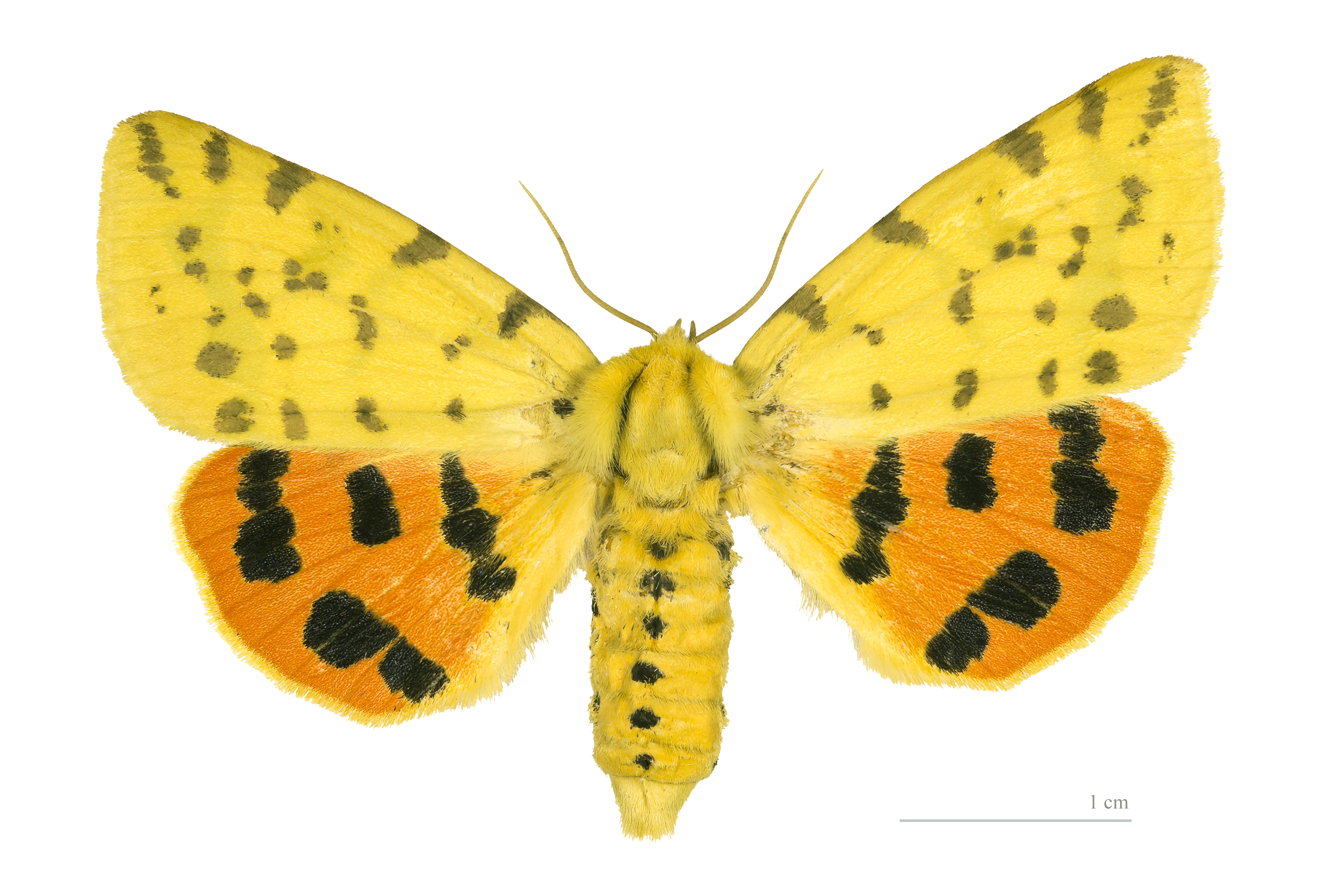

Scientific classification
- Kingdom: Animalia
- Phylum: Arthropoda
- Clade: Pancrustacea
- Class: Insecta
- Order: Lepidoptera
- Superfamily: Noctuoidea
- Family: Erebidae
- Subfamily: Arctiinae
- Genus: Diacrisia
- Species: D. purpurata

Binomial name
- Diacrisia purpurata (Linnaeus, 1758)

Synonyms
- Rhyparia purpurata Linnaeus, 1758

= Diacrisia purpurata =

Species of moth

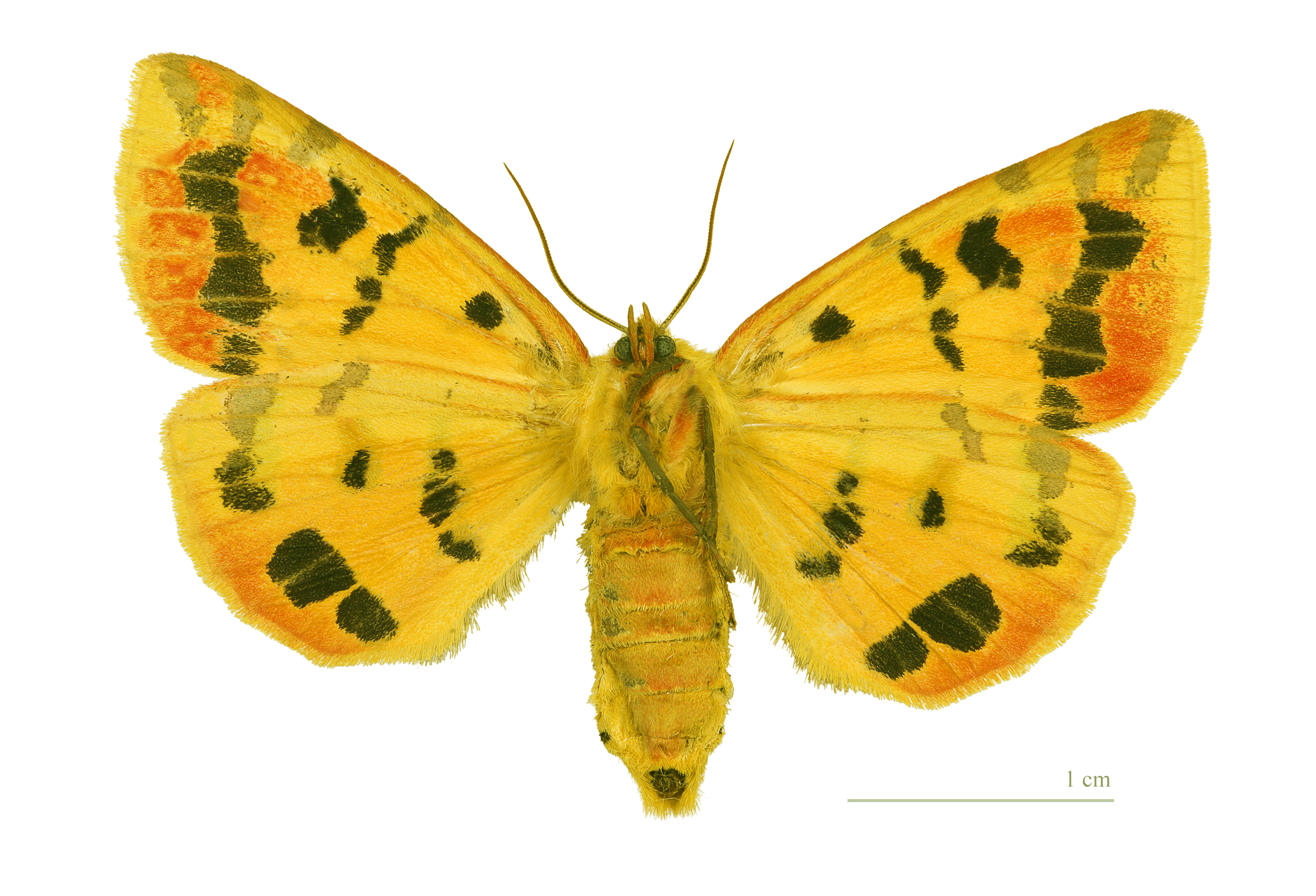
Ventral side

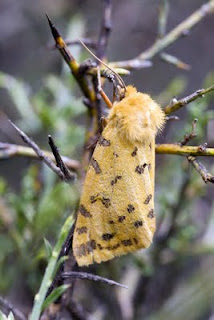

Diacrisia purpurata, the purple tiger, is a moth of the subfamily Arctiinae. The species was first described by Carl Linnaeus in his 1758 10th edition of Systema Naturae. It is found in Europe, Anatolia, Syria, Transcaucasus, Central Asia (mainly in Kazakhstan and Kyrgyzstan), southern Siberia, Mongolia, Amur Region, northern China, Korea and Japan (Honshu).

The length of the forewings is 18–22 mm for males and 22–25 mm for females. The moth flies June to August depending on the location.

The larvae feed on Calluna and sometimes other herbaceous plants and deciduous trees.

The species of the genus Rhyparia, including this one, were moved to Diacrisia as a result of phylogenetic research published by Rönkä et al. in 2016.
