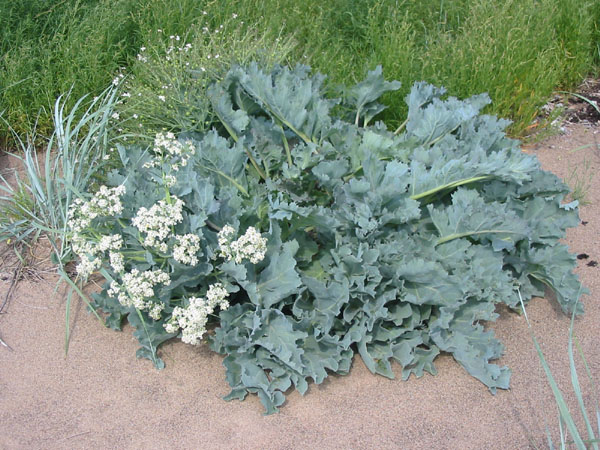
- Growing in Estonia

Scientific classification
- Kingdom: Plantae
- Clade: Embryophytes
- Clade: Tracheophytes
- Clade: Angiosperms
- Clade: Eudicots
- Clade: Rosids
- Order: Brassicales
- Family: Brassicaceae
- Genus: Crambe
- Species: C. maritima

Binomial name
- Crambe maritima L.

= Crambe maritima =

Sea kale

Species of plant

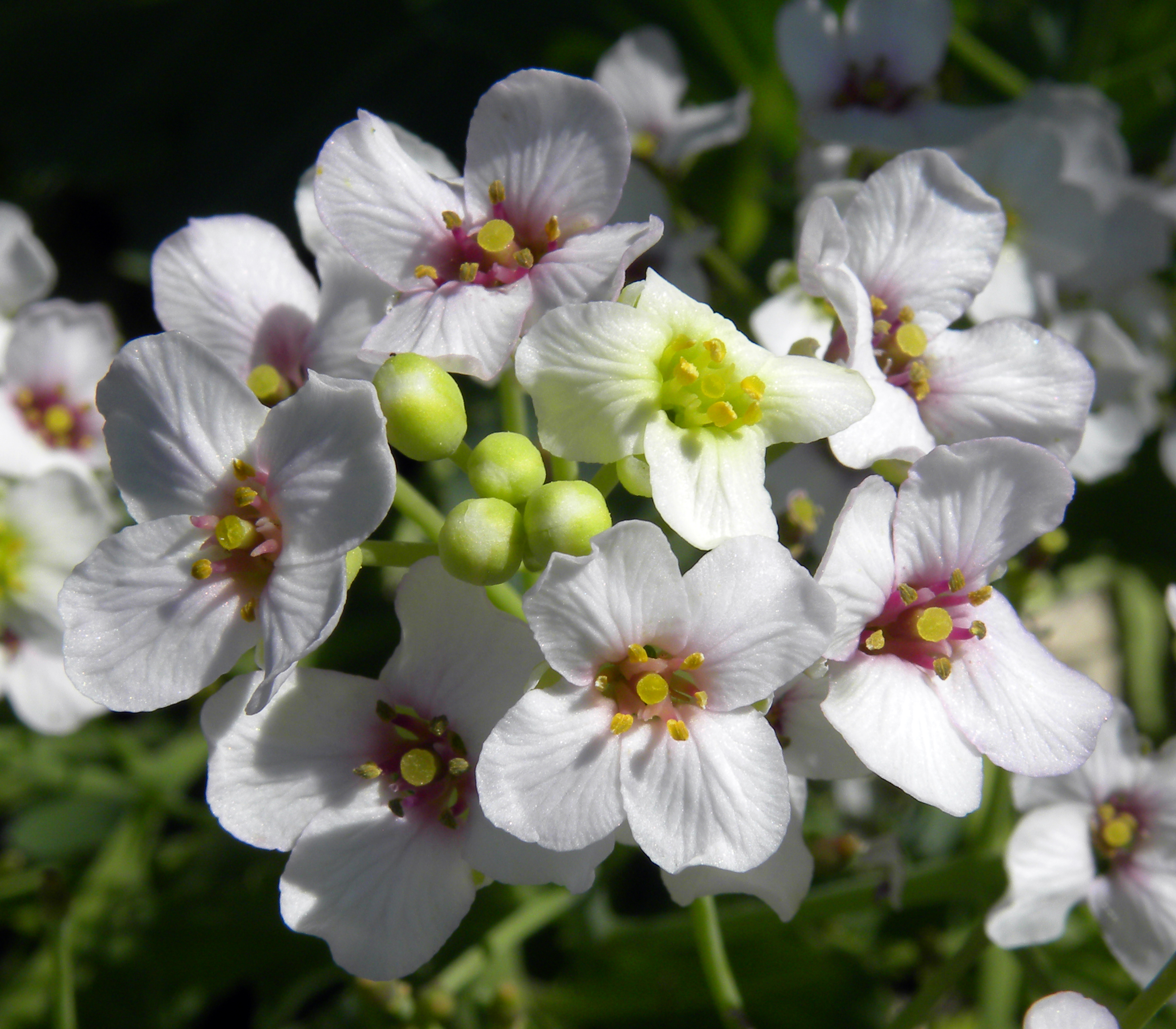
Crambe maritima flowers; Saaremaa, Estonia

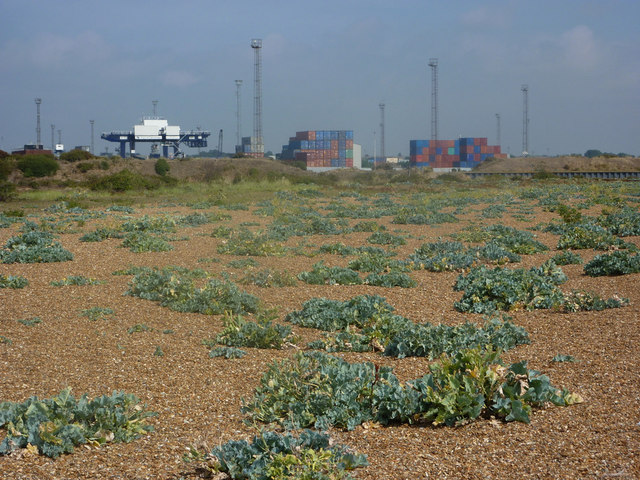
Shingle beach with sea kale, Landguard Fort, Suffolk

Crambe maritima, common name sea kale, seakale or crambe, is a species of halophytic (salt-tolerant) flowering plant in the genus Crambe of the family Brassicaceae. It grows wild along the coasts of mainland Europe and the British Isles.

The plant is related to the cabbage and was first cultivated as a vegetable in Britain around the turn of the 18th century. The blanched stems are eaten as a vegetable, and became popular in the mid-19th century.

== Description ==
Growing to 75 cm (30 in) tall by 60 cm (24 in) wide, it is a mound-forming, spreading perennial. It has large fleshy glaucous collard-like leaves and abundant white flowers. The globular pods contain a single seed.

== Distribution ==
This species appears to be a European endemic, with a distribution generally confined to two discontinuous coastal regions of Europe; the species is absent from North Africa and the Middle East. It occurs in the Black Sea coasts of Bulgaria, Romania, Turkey, and Ukraine including the Crimea, but is absent from most of the Mediterranean, recurring again from northern France and the British Isles to the Baltic Sea. In the Iberian Peninsula, Greece and Italy it is replaced by the species Crambe hispanica, with which its distribution has been confused with until quite recently; the species is absent from Portugal, Greece, Italy and Spain, but is said to occur in Croatia.

Although it was once believed to be found growing in Israel and Jordan, or alternatively Lebanon and Syria, these populations are now classified as C. hispanica.

It is very rare in Northern Ireland, but has been recorded in Counties Down and Antrim, and in a number of other coastal counties in the island of Ireland. In England it is primarily found on the southeast coast (extensively along Chesil Beach in Dorset), but it also occurs on stretches of the East Anglian and Cumbrian coasts. In Wales it is found on the northern beaches and in Scotland in the extreme southwest.

It is uncommonly found along the coast of Norway, particularly so in the Færder National Park.

== Ecology ==
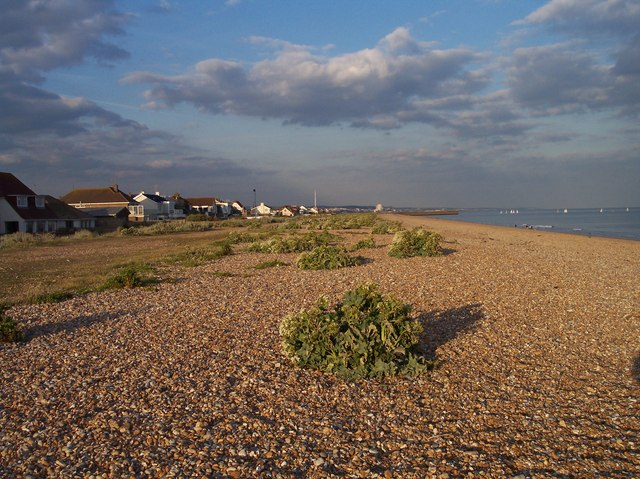
Sea kale growing in typical habitat in Shoreham Beach nature reserve, UK

Crambe maritima is a halophyte, meaning that it tolerates salt and is therefore found on coastal beaches where little else thrives. It is usually found above high tide mark on beaches in which the sand includes pebbles or rock. A typical habitat for the species in Britain is vegetated shingle beaches, where it grows in association with yellow horned poppy and curled dock. It is the dominant plant species in plant communities found in fragmentary, endangered habitats on shingle beaches and bars on the southern Baltic coasts of Sweden, Finland and Estonia, east to Mecklenburg, where it grows together with Leymus arenarius, Euphorbia palustris, Honkenya peploides, Angelica archangelica subsp. litoralis, Atriplex spp., Beta vulgaris subsp. maritima, Elymus repens, Geranium robertianum subsp. rubricaule, Glaucium flavum, Isatis tinctoria, Ligusticum scoticum, Mertensia maritima, Silene uniflora, Tripleurospermum maritimum and Valeriana salina. Trapping wind-blown sand, clumps of sea kale may initiate the formation of dunes.

== Cultivation and culinary use ==
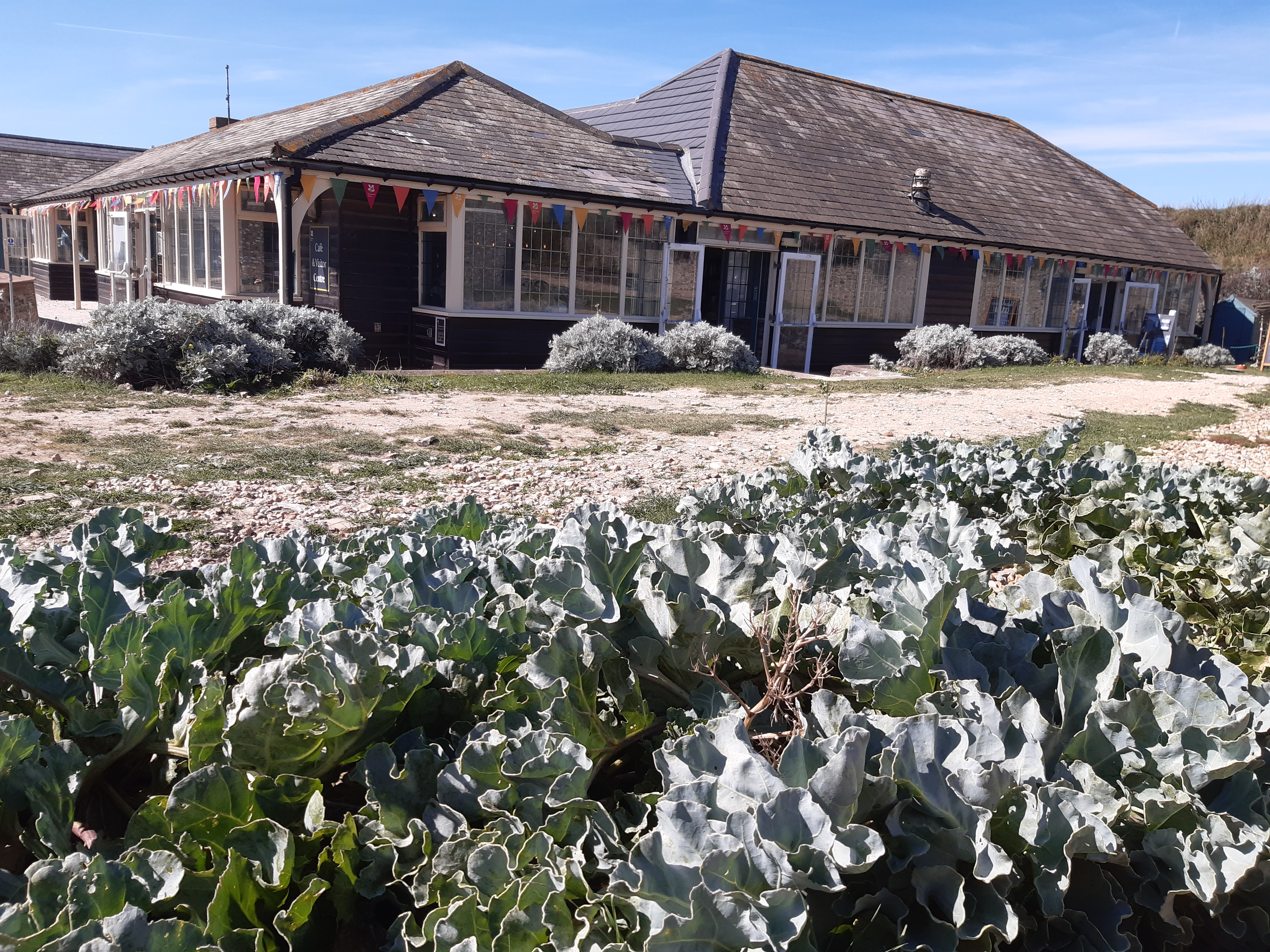
Sea kale as decorative plant in Birling Gap garden on dry sandy soil by the sea

There are records from the 18th century of local people along the beaches of Kent, Sussex and Hampshire digging out and harvesting the emerging shoots as a vegetable from naturally occurring root crowns in the early springtime. This custom was first reported by Phillip Miller in his 1731 Gardener's Dictionary as practised among the people of Sussex, and it was seen once in the 18th century being sold as food at the Chichester market in 1753.

John Martyn was the first to publish some practical notes on cultivating the plant in a late edition of Miller's work, but William Curtis was the first to publish a tract about his experiments of growing the plant as a vegetable crop in London in 1799, just before his death, with John Maher giving a reading before the Horticultural Society of London in 1805 which elaborated slightly on the work of Curtis. Both Curtis and Maher recommended growing the plant as a forced, blanched vegetable, growing the root crown in a ceramic cylinder which could be capped with a closed blanching pot. Over and about this pot fresh manure would be heaped a few feet deep, the heat produced when this dung rotted would be sufficient to force the plant to bolt as early as December, although later in the winter was recommended. For those without the financial means to purchase expensive blanching pots, Maher suggests covering the plants in a mat covered by a thick layer of gravel, and Curtis mentions simply hoeing a foot of soil over the crown, or piling sea sand, pebbles or coal ash over it, although both agree this will produce a much inferior crop. An area of roughly five square feet could hold a single root crown consisting of three plants, which after growing out from seed for three years could be forced at least twice a season to yield four to six shoots of up to twelve inches, although usually much less.

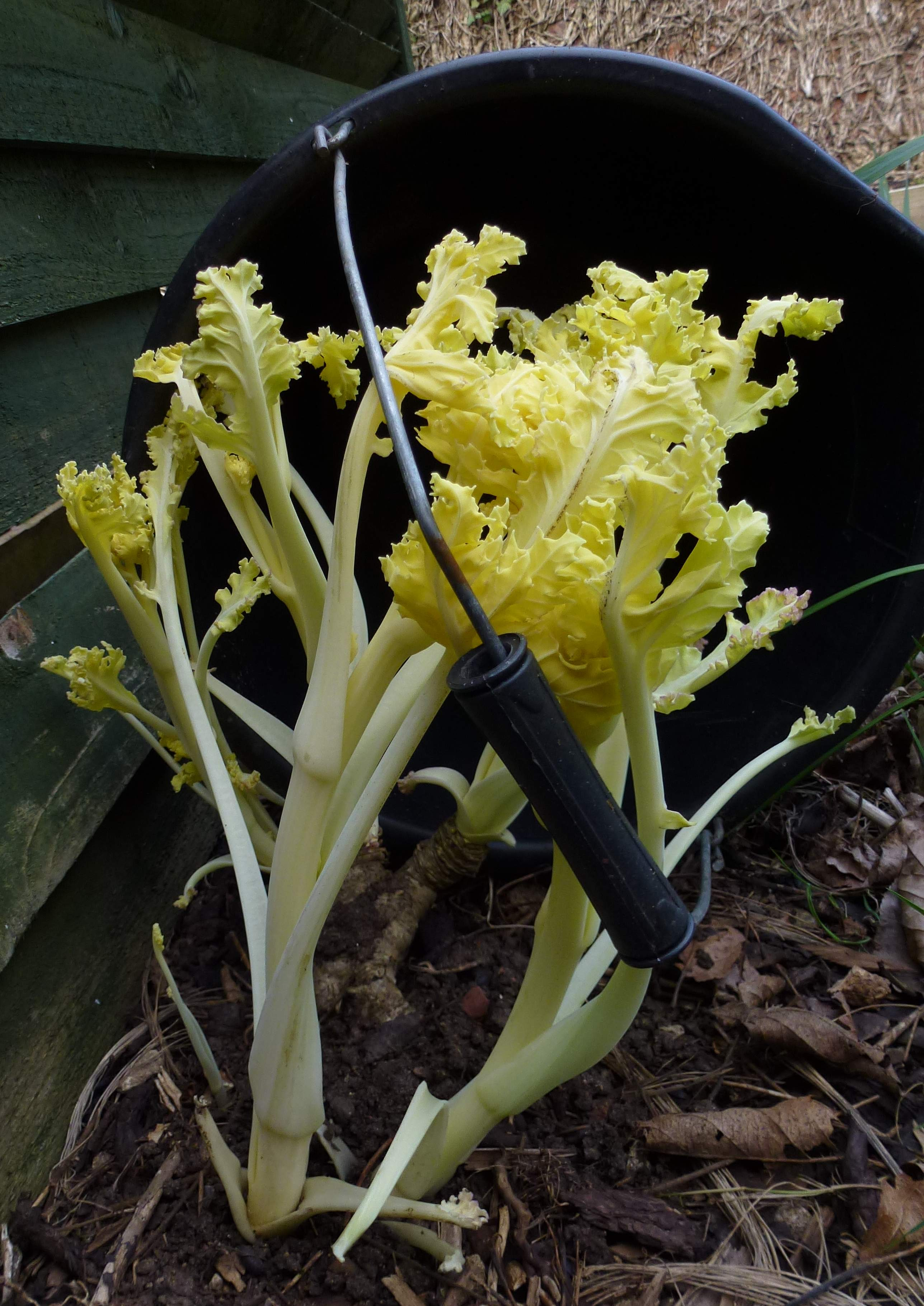
Blanched shoots

Thomas Jefferson grew sea kale at Monticello between 1820 and 1825. It was served at the Royal Pavilion in Brighton, when Prince Regent George IV of the United Kingdom (1762–1830) used it as a seaside retreat. By the Victorian Era sea kale had become "in very general use" as a vegetable in Britain, according to the popular cookbook Mrs Beeton's Book of Household Management, in which it is called a type of asparagus, although at nine pennies for a basket of sprouts, it was one of the most expensive vegetables to be had. Its cultivation is discussed in older books on vegetable growing. Wild stocks were severely reduced in Britain by forcing in situ and collecting for food until the practice was banned in the early 20th century. Sea kale fell out of favour, but in the early 21st century, British chefs made it fashionable again. It is commercially grown by a number of farmers in Britain.

A tiny experimental plot of sea kale is cultivated on Texel, a North Sea island in the Netherlands. It is irrigated with adulterated seawater.

Maher mentions that he personally considered blanched sea kale a delicacy. Curtis says that as a food, boiled twenty minutes and covered in melted butter, it resembled most asparagus, although with hints of cabbage. He reports most he served it to found it agreeable; although some found it no better than cabbage, others found it superior even to asparagus. Although Curtis had never tried to do so himself, he mentions someone once made a decent stew of it and also theorizes that perhaps it might be well suited to be pickled.
