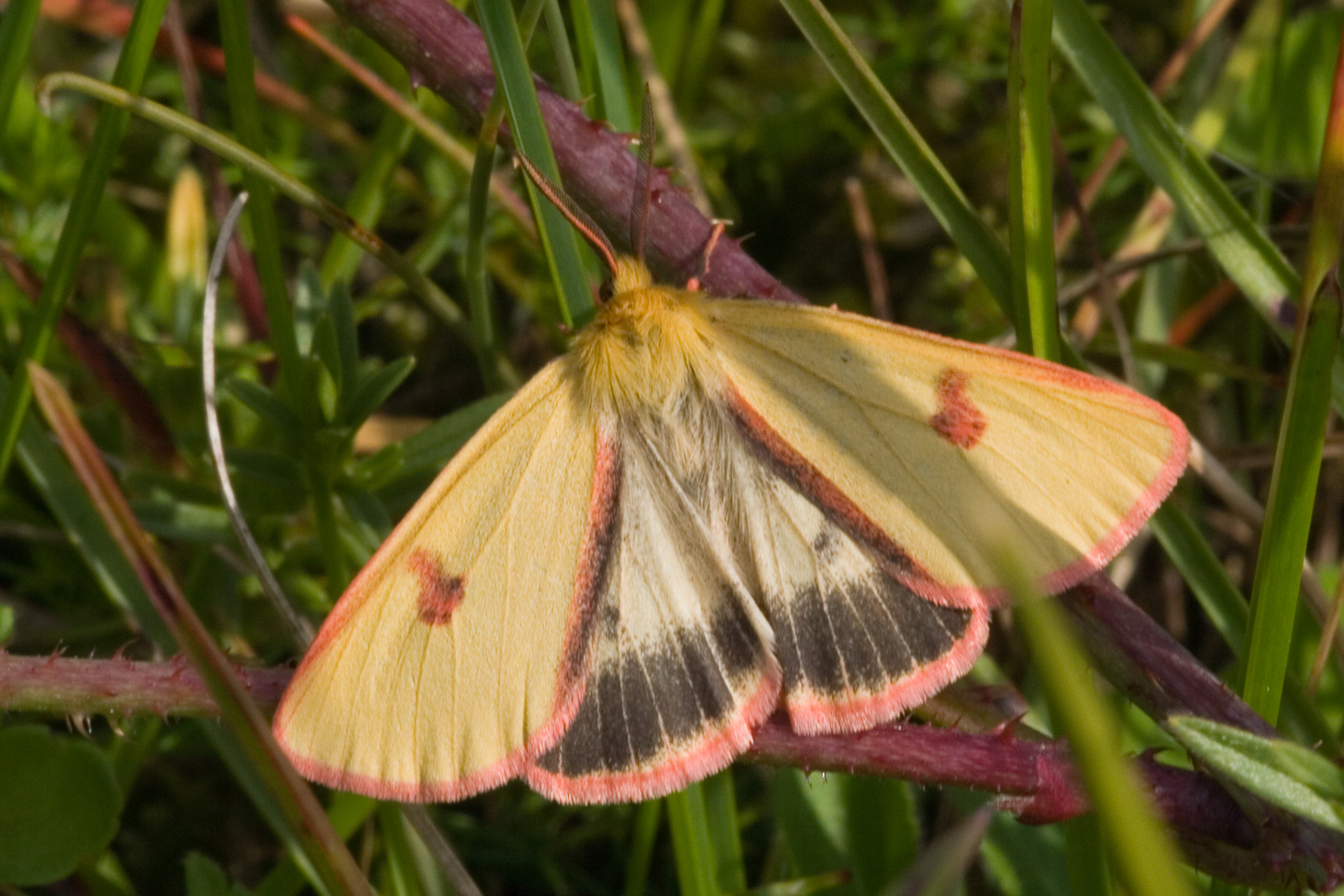
- Diacrisia sannio

Scientific classification
- Kingdom: Animalia
- Phylum: Arthropoda
- Clade: Pancrustacea
- Class: Insecta
- Order: Lepidoptera
- Superfamily: Noctuoidea
- Family: Erebidae
- Subfamily: Arctiinae
- Subtribe: Arctiina
- Genus: Diacrisia; Hübner, 1819

Synonyms
- Euthemonia Stephens, 1828

= Diacrisia =

Genus of moths

Diacrisia is a genus of tiger moths in the family Erebidae. The genus was erected by Jacob Hübner in 1819. Its species can be found in Europe and Asia.

The species of the genera Rhyparia and Rhyparioides were placed in Diacrisia as a result of phylogenetic research published by Rönkä et al. in 2016.

== Species ==
- Diacrisia amurensis (Bremer, 1861)
- Diacrisia aurapsa Swinhoe, 1905
- Diacrisia echo Rothschild, 1910
- Diacrisia irene Butler, 1881
- Diacrisia metelkana (Lederer, 1861)
- Diacrisia nebulosa (Butler, 1877)
- Diacrisia porthesioides Rothschild, 1910
- Diacrisia purpurata (Linnaeus, 1758) Purple Tiger
- Diacrisia sannio (Linnaeus, 1758) Clouded Buff
- Diacrisia subvaria (Walker, 1855)

For Diacrisia sublutea see name on BOLD database, may be unpublished BOLD

For Diacrisia aspersa (Mabille, 1878) (i.e. per Hampson, 1901 see Detoulgoetia virginalis (Butler, 1878) with junior synonym Spilosoma aspersa Mabille, 1878)
