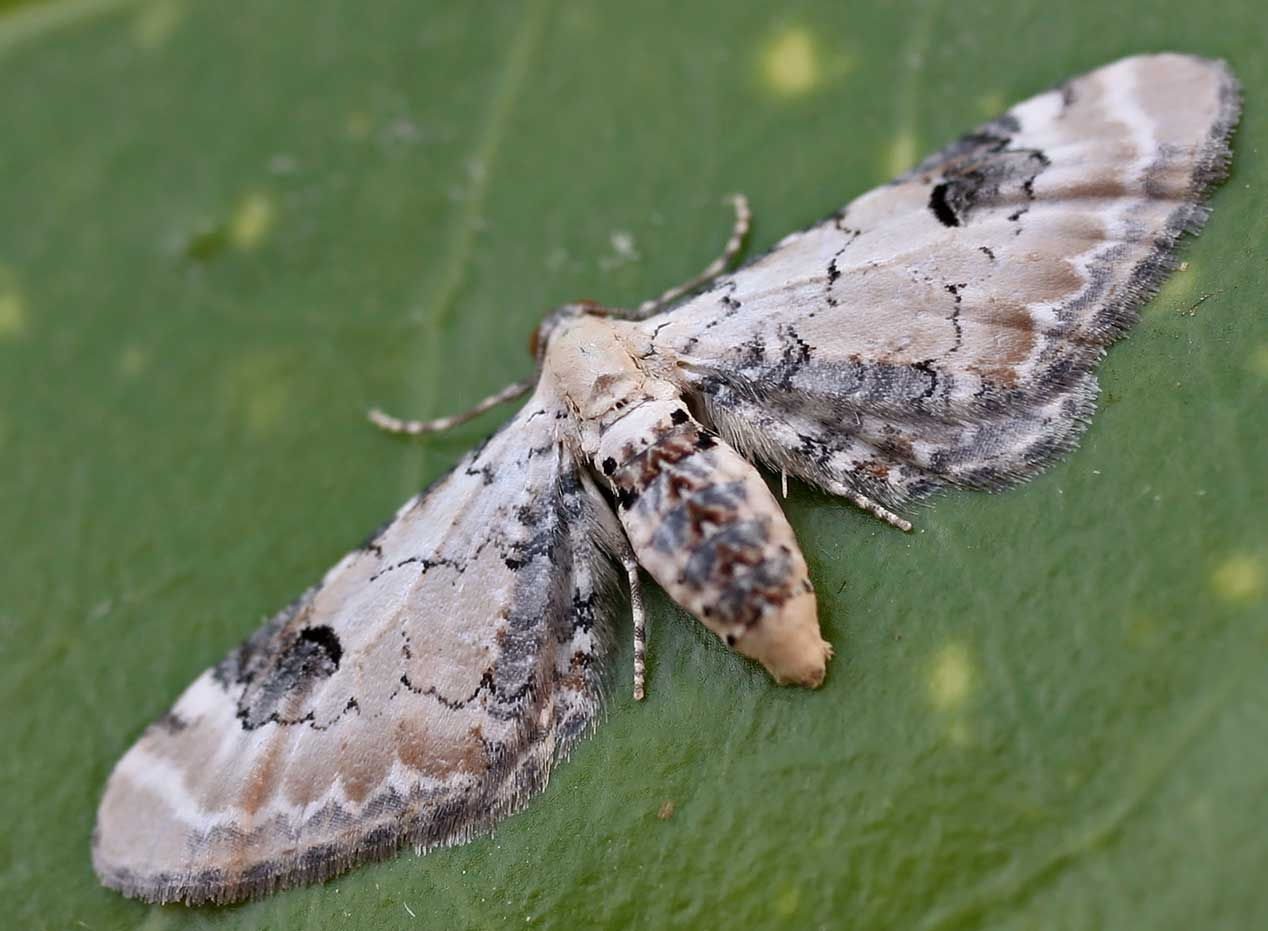

Scientific classification
- Domain: Eukaryota
- Kingdom: Animalia
- Phylum: Arthropoda
- Class: Insecta
- Order: Lepidoptera
- Family: Geometridae
- Genus: Eupithecia
- Species: E. centaureata

Binomial name
- Eupithecia centaureata (Denis & Schiffermüller, 1775)

Synonyms
- Geometra centaureata Denis & Schiffermüller, 1775; Phaleana signata Scopoli, 1763; Geometra oblonga Thunberg, 1784; Eupithecia oblongata; Phaleana boloniensis Fourcroy, 1785; Eupithecia oblongata var. centralisata Staudinger, 1892; Eupithecia oblongata f. obscura Dietze, 1910; Eupithecia centaureata dsharkendi Vojnits, 1977; Eupithecia chinae Vojnits, 1977; Eupithecia dagestani Vojnits, 1977

= Lime-speck pug =

Species of moth

The lime-speck pug (Eupithecia centaureata) is a moth of the family Geometridae. It is a common species throughout the Palearctic region (where it is found in Europe, Central Asia, Mongolia, southern Siberia, eastern China (Guangdong) and Taiwan), the Near East and North Africa.

== Description ==
This is a distinctive species, all the wings being largely white except for a black blotch on the costa of the forewing. The wingspan is 20–24 mm. In the ab. obscura Dietze.(perhaps developed chiefly in Asia but also recorded from the Tyrol) the ground-colour of both wings has a smoky suffusion. In the ab. centralisata Stgr., chiefly from Palestine and Central Asia, the markings are weaker, sometimes (except the discal mark) almost entirely obsolete. The larva is long and thin, white-yellow with a red dorsal stripe and horseshoe-shaped red spots running down the sides.

Often two broods are produced each year and the adults can be seen at any time during the summer and autumn. The moths fly at night and are attracted to light and nectar-rich flowers.

The larva is rather variable but is usually green or yellow, often with red markings. It feeds on the flowers of a variety of plants (see list below). The species overwinters as a pupa.

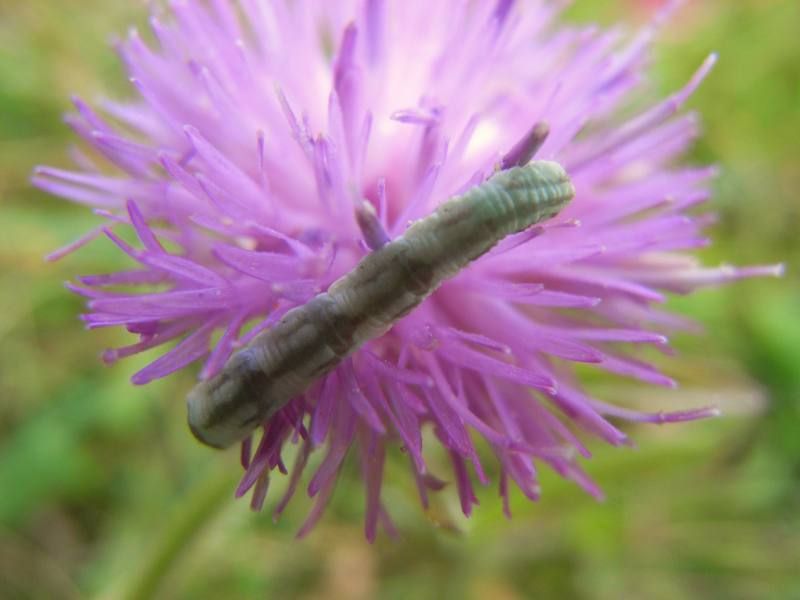
Larva

=== Larval food plants ===
- Achillea – yarrow
- Angelica
- Arctium – burdock
- Artemisia
- Calluna – heather
- Campanula
- Centaurea
- Cirsium – thistle
- Crambe
- Filipendula – meadowsweet
- Galium – bedstraw
- Hieracium – hawkweed
- Lotus – bird's-foot trefoil
- Lysimachia – yellow loosestrife
- Matricaria – mayweed
- Medicago – alfalfa
- Pimpinella – burnet saxifrage
- Rumex – sorrel
- Selinum – milk-parsley
- Silene – bladder campion
- Solidago – goldenrod
- Tanacetum – tansy
- Trifolium – red clover
- Vicia – tufted vetch
