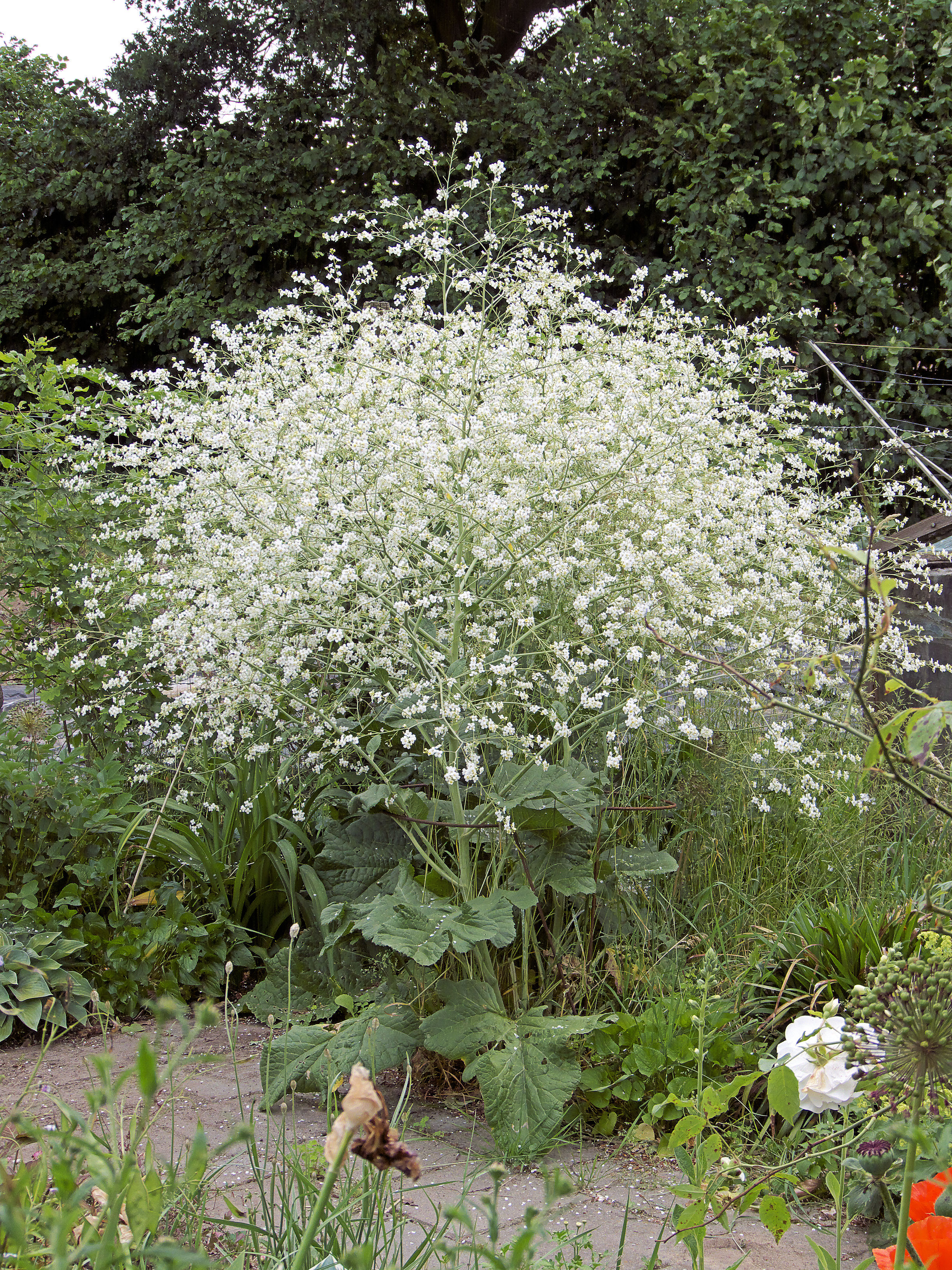

Scientific classification
- Kingdom: Plantae
- Clade: Tracheophytes
- Clade: Angiosperms
- Clade: Eudicots
- Clade: Rosids
- Order: Brassicales
- Family: Brassicaceae
- Genus: Crambe
- Species: C. cordifolia

Binomial name
- Crambe cordifolia Steven

= Crambe cordifolia =

Species of flowering plant

Crambe cordifolia, the greater sea-kale, colewort or heartleaf crambe ( syn. Crambe glabrata DC.), is a species of flowering plant in the family Brassicaceae, native to the Caucasus. It has gained the Royal Horticultural Society's Award of Garden Merit.

== Epithet ==
The Latin specific epithet cordifolia, meaning "heart-shaped", refers to the leaves.

== Description ==
Growing to 2.5 m (8 ft) tall by 1.5 m (5 ft) broad, it is a substantial clump-forming herbaceous perennial with kidney-shaped dark green leaves, 35 cm (14 in) or more in length, which die down in mid- to late summer. It is cultivated in gardens for its broad crinkled foliage and spectacular multi-branched inflorescences of many small fragrant white, cruciform (cross-shaped) flowers, reaching up to 2 metres (6 ft 7 in) high and appearing in early summer. Under droughty conditions the foliage depreciates. The plant is tap-rooted and resents disturbance.
