= Diacrisia irene =

Scientific classification
- Kingdom: Animalia
- Phylum: Arthropoda
- Clade: Pancrustacea
- Class: Insecta
- Order: Lepidoptera
- Superfamily: Noctuoidea
- Family: Erebidae
- Subfamily: Arctiinae
- Genus: Diacrisia
- Species: D. irene

Binomial name
- Diacrisia irene Butler, 1881

Synonyms
- Diacrisia russula amuri Staudinger, 1892; Diacrisia sannio rishiriensis Matsumura, 1930; Diacrisia sannio rubroventralis Bryk, 1948 [1949]

Species of moth

Diacrisia irene is a moth of the family Erebidae. It was described by Arthur Gardiner Butler in 1881. It is found in the Russian Far East (Amur, Primorye, Sakhalin, Kunashir), eastern China, Korea and Japan.
