= Cetoleic acid =

Names
- IUPAC name (Z)-docos-11-enoic acid

Identifiers
CAS Number	1002-96-6
3D model (JSmol)	Interactive image
ChEBI	CHEBI:32428
ChEMBL	ChEMBL3103072
ChemSpider	4445898
PubChem CID	5282771
UNII	62EZI2C5SE
CompTox Dashboard (EPA)	DTXSID00920491
- InChI: InChI=1S/C22H42O2/c1-2-3-4-5-6-7-8-9-10-11-12-13-14-15-16-17-18-19-20-21-22(23)24/h11-12H,2-10,13-21H2,1H3,(H,23,24)/b12-11- Key: KJDZDTDNIULJBE-QXMHVHEDSA-N
- SMILES: CCCCCCCCCC/C=C\CCCCCCCCCC(=O)O

Properties
Chemical formula	C_{22}H_{42}O_{2}
Molar mass	338.576 g·mol^{−1}
Density	0.891 g/cm^{3}
Melting point	32–33 °C (90–91 °F; 305–306 K)
Boiling point	453.3 °C (847.9 °F; 726.5 K)

Hazards
Flash point	349.9
- Except where otherwise noted, data are given for materials in their standard state (at 25 °C [77 °F], 100 kPa). Infobox references

Cetoleic acid is a linear very long-chain fatty acid with 22 carbon atoms and one double bond, in the position 11=12 with cis-configuration. The acid belongs to the Omega-11 group.

Cetoleic acid is a positional isomer of erucic acid. There is also an isomer with a Δ11 double bond in the trans-configuration, also present in nature, called cetoelaidic acid.

== Natural occurrence ==
The acid is present in the wax esters of jojoba oil at 15–20% and in avellana oil from the Chilean hazelnut (Gevuina avellana) at about 9–10%. It is also present in the glycerol esters of some fish oils, with the concentration in cod liver oil reaching up to 12%. Cetoleic acid is toxic; its toxic effects are similar to those of erucic acid.

== Uses ==
Cetoleic acid may be used in cardiovascular disease research.

== Biological activity ==
Cetoleic acid can promote the synthesis of ALA in human HepG2 cells and EPA in vitro in salmon liver cells, affecting cholesterol levels in rodents^{[8][9]}.
