= Erucamide =

Names
- IUPAC name (Z)-Docos-13-enamide
- Other names: Erucylamide; Erucic acid amide; Erucic amide; cis-13-Docosenamide

Identifiers
CAS Number	112-84-5
3D model (JSmol)	Interactive image
ChEBI	CHEBI:142245
ChEMBL	ChEMBL1232565
ChemSpider	4517399
ECHA InfoCard	100.003.645
EC Number	204-009-2
PubChem CID	5365371
UNII	0V89VY25BN
CompTox Dashboard (EPA)	DTXSID4026929
- InChI: InChI=1S/C22H43NO/c1-2-3-4-5-6-7-8-9-10-11-12-13-14-15-16-17-18-19-20-21-22(23)24/h9-10H,2-8,11-21H2,1H3,(H2,23,24)/b10-9- Key: UAUDZVJPLUQNMU-KTKRTIGZSA-N
- SMILES: CCCCCCCC/C=C\CCCCCCCCCCCC(=O)N

Properties
Chemical formula	C_{22}H_{43}NO
Molar mass	337.592 g·mol^{−1}
Appearance	White solid
Melting point	83.5–84 °C (182.3–183.2 °F; 356.6–357.1 K)
Solubility in water	Insoluble
- Except where otherwise noted, data are given for materials in their standard state (at 25 °C [77 °F], 100 kPa). Infobox references

Erucamide is a fatty acid amide resulting from the formal condensation of erucic acid with ammonia. It has a role as a metabolite in humans and other animals and in plants. In the plastic manufacturing industry, it is commonly used as a slip additive.

== Uses ==
Erucamide is used as a slip promoter, antiblock agent, and lubricant in plastics. It serves as a viscosity controlling and opacifying agent in cosmetics. In industry, it functions as a processing aid, lubricating agent, anti-adhesive agent, and corrosion inhibitor. In the United States, it is authorized as an indirect food additive in adhesives under 21 CFR 175.105.

== Research ==
Erucamide has been reported to ameliorate depression and anxiety-like behaviors in mouse models.
