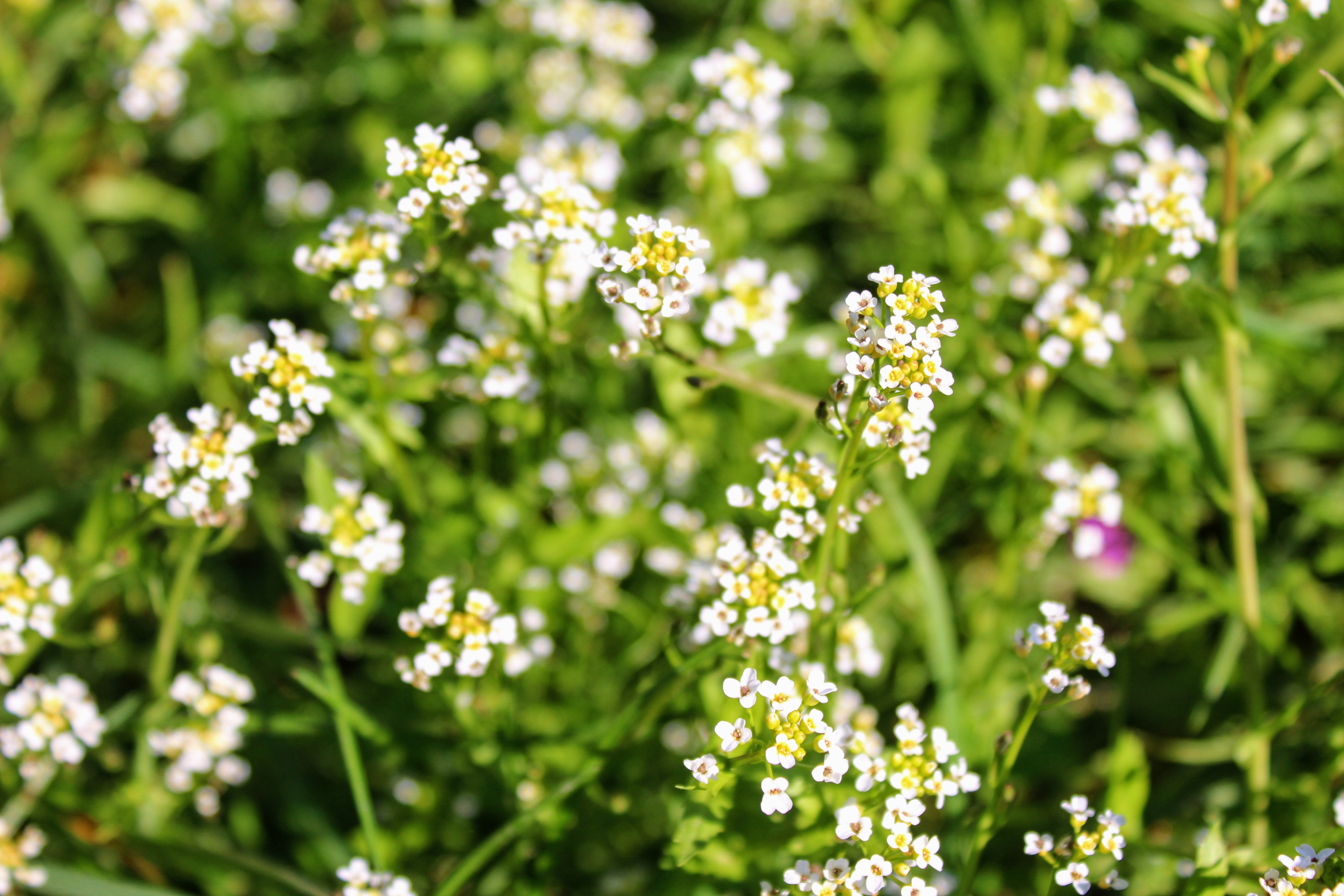

Scientific classification
- Kingdom: Plantae
- Clade: Tracheophytes
- Clade: Angiosperms
- Clade: Eudicots
- Clade: Rosids
- Order: Brassicales
- Family: Brassicaceae
- Genus: Crambe
- Species: C. abyssinica

Binomial name
- Crambe abyssinica R.E.Fr.

= Crambe abyssinica =

Species of flowering plant

Crambe abyssinica is an annual oilseed crop of the family Brassicaceae. It is mainly cultivated due to the high levels of erucic acid that are contained in its seeds. The crambe oil is used for industrial purposes and its side products can be partly used as animal feed.

== Botany ==
Crambe abyssinica has its origins in eastern Africa and was domesticated in the Mediterranean region. It grows up to a height between 1 and 2 metres (1 and 2 yards), depending on field conditions. Its cropping cycle is rather short, ranging from 90 to 100 days. Usually, its straight stalk is moderately branched and its leaves are of an oval shape. The plant's flowers are small and white, arranged in racemes and have four free sepals, four free alternating petals, two shorter and four longer free stamens, what is typical for Brassicaceae. Mostly, these flowers are self-pollinated, but some cases of cross-pollination have been observed. Its indehiscent fruits enclose only one spherical seed that contains around 26% protein, 18% fibre and 35% oil. This oil content is lower than what can be extracted from rapeseed and the oil is not edible. The pericarp of the seed usually adheres to the seed even at harvest.

== History of agricultural use and cultivation ==
Crambe has not been in cultivation for a long time. It was probably cultivated for the first time in the 1930s in the former USSR. Later the crop was tested in other regions of the USSR, in Sweden and in Poland, where crambe was grown on 25,000 ha (~62,000 acres) after the second world war. Research efforts in northern and eastern Europe were increased and the agronomical characteristics and industrial uses of crambe were intensively studied. By successive selection within C. abyssinica, conventional breeding started in the 1950s in some European countries. Hereby improved strains were introduced to Canada and the United States. Further selection and crossing of different accessions led to the release of new varieties in the 1970s. Through introgression of wild populations and mass selection two new cultivars were created in the 1980s which were promoted as high yielding sources of erucic acid. In the 1990s a breeding program was started in the Netherlands. Nevertheless, after a period of great efforts to bring crambe into extended cultivation, interest in the crop in Europe has declined in recent years.

== Cultivation ==
With a germination temperature of 6 °C (43 °F) which is also equivalent to the basal growing temperature, C. abyssinica is a winter crop in southern Europe and subtropical areas whereas it is cultivated as spring crop in northern Europe and more continental areas. The optimal growing temperature is approximately 15 °C (59 °F). It tolerates annual average temperature between 5.7 and 16.2 °C (42 and 61 °F) and frost down to −6 °C (21 °F). Because of its ability to get along with only 350 millimetres (14 in) of precipitation, C. abyssinica is considered to be relatively drought tolerant. Nevertheless, drought stress during the development stages of flowering and grain filling reduces productivity. Cultivation is possible up to an annual precipitation of 1,200 millimetres (47 in). Crambe has modest demands regarding soil properties, it tolerates soil pH from 5.0 to 7.8. Low soil depth and a high stone and gravel content decrease drought tolerance.

Seeds of many improved varieties are available on the market and are sown at a rate of approximately 120 per square metre (100 per square yard) and at a depth of 5–15 millimetres (1/4–5/8 in). Seed maturation is uniform and the 1000 seed weight varies between 6.0 and 7.5 grams (7/32 and 17/64 oz). Management procedures from sowing to harvesting can be conducted largely with the same machinery used for common cereals. Yield levels vary widely at 1,100–1,600 kilograms per hectare (980–1,430 lb/acre) in Russia, 450–2,500 kilograms per hectare (400–2,230 lb/acre) in the U.S. and 600–2,400 kilograms per hectare (540–2,140 lb/acre) in Germany.

Crambe abyssinica can be easily inserted in crop rotations with a requirement of 1600 growing degree-days. Its rotation contingent should not exceed 25%. Because of similar soil requirements and increased soil borne pathogen pressure, cultivation directly after other Brassicaceae species should be avoided. Also to be avoided is cultivation after artificial grassland and fallows because these will enrich the soil seed bank with weeds and there are few pre-emergence weed management methods available.

== Use ==
Crambe abyssinica is cultivated for a wide range of industrial purposes. The interest lies mainly in the high erucic acid content (55-60%) of its seed oil, and makes the crop a competitive option to other oil plants as industrial rapeseed. The composition of crambe oil gives this product several special traits, such as high smoke point, good wettability of different materials and high viscosity. In addition, its oil has a higher biodegradability than mineral oils. Therefore, erucic acid derived compounds are used as additives in the plastic industry, high temperature hydraulic fluids, waxes, base for paints and coatings, lubricants and many other products. Furthermore, the extracted seed oil is used in pharmaceutical products and cosmetics.

The crambe meal, which is a side product of industrial oil production, can be used as a protein supplement for animal feed. It contains approximately 46% proteins, which are of high nutritional quality. Unfortunately, the crambe seed shred also contains toxic compounds such as glucosinolates, tannins and inositol phosphate. The use as forage is therefore very limited. The incorporation rate of crambe by-products into animal feed should not be higher than 5% for growing-finishing pigs, 15% for dairy cows, and 19% for sheep. It is not recommended to feed poultry.

A possible new use for crambe could be biofuels since the oil composition is suitable for processing.

== Current and future breeding efforts ==
Genetically, C. abyssinica has a set of 2n=90 chromosomes and is hexaploid. However, it shows low genetic variation in important agronomic traits, e.g. erucic acid content. Thus, improvement of cultivars through selection is difficult to achieve. A new source of variation could be found in the related taxon Crambe hispanica. Recent efforts are found in the field of gene technology. To overcome the limited genetic variation, gene technology has been used in recent years to improve different important agronomic traits of crambe. Site-directed mutagenesis could be another tool for further improvement of the crop. However, the genetic control of many agronomic traits are unknown, thus the potential for genetic improvement is limited at the moment. Additionally further research aims to assess the potential of using the seed cake in protein-based plastic production and to find further uses for the whole plant.

== See also ==
- Vegetable oils
