= Brassylic acid =

Brassylic Acid

Names
- IUPAC name tridecanedioic acid
- Other names 1,11-Undecanedicarboxylic acid 1,13-Tridecanedioic acid

Identifiers
CAS Number	505-52-2
3D model (JSmol)	Interactive image
ChEBI	CHEBI:73718
ChEMBL	ChEMBL3187746
ChemSpider	10026
ECHA InfoCard	100.007.284
EC Number	208-011-4
PubChem CID	10458
UNII	PL3IQ40C34
CompTox Dashboard (EPA)	DTXSID9021683
- InChI: InChI=1S/C13H24O4/c14-12(15)10-8-6-4-2-1-3-5-7-9-11-13(16)17/h1-11H2,(H,14,15)(H,16,17) Key: DXNCZXXFRKPEPY-UHFFFAOYSA-N
- SMILES: C(CCCCCC(=O)O)CCCCCC(=O)O

Properties
Chemical formula	C_{13}H_{24}O_{4}
Molar mass	244.3273 gm/mol
Appearance	white solid
Melting point	114 °C (237 °F; 387 K)
Solubility in water	0.0025 g/100 mL

Hazards
- Occupational safety and health (OHS/OSH)
Main hazards	Irritant
- Except where otherwise noted, data are given for materials in their standard state (at 25 °C [77 °F], 100 kPa). Infobox references

Brassylic acid is an organic compound with chemical formula HO_{2}C(CH_{2})_{11}CO_{2}H. A white solid, it is the C13-dicarboxylic acid. It is prepared by oxidation of erucic acid, which is abundant in some seed oils. Pelargonic acid is the coproduct. In the industrial setting, brassylic acid is used to produce specialty nylons, such as nylon 1313, as well as polymers, biodegradable solvents, lubricants, perfumes and plastics.

Brassylic acid was first created in the nineteenth century through the oxidative ozonolysis of Erucic acid. It can yield 2 kinds of salts as it has 2 carboxylic acid groups attached. It occurs as a white powder, or as flakes.
