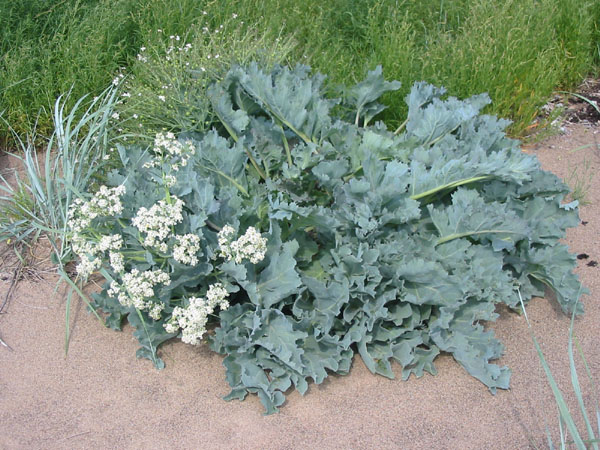
- Crambe maritima in Estonia

Scientific classification
- Kingdom: Plantae
- Clade: Tracheophytes
- Clade: Angiosperms
- Clade: Eudicots
- Clade: Rosids
- Order: Brassicales
- Family: Brassicaceae
- Genus: Crambe; L.

Species
- See text

= Crambe =

Genus of flowering plants

Crambe is a genus of annual and perennial flowering plants in the family Brassicaceae, native to a variety of habitats in Europe, Turkey, southwest and central Asia and eastern Africa. They carry dense racemes of tiny white or yellow flowers on (mostly leafless) stems above the basal leaves. Crambe hispanica subsp. abyssinica, formerly known as Crambe abyssinica, is grown for the oil from the seeds that has characteristics similar to whale oil.

The word "crambe" derives, via the Latin crambe, from the Greek κράμβη, a kind of cabbage.

Crambe species are used as food plants by the larvae of the weevil Lixus canescens (Coleoptera) and some Lepidoptera species including the lime-speck pug.

== Species ==
Currently accepted species include:

- Crambe alutacea Hand.-Mazz.
- Crambe arborea Webb ex Christ
- Crambe armena N.Busch
- Crambe cordifolia Steven
- Crambe edentula Fisch. & C.A.Mey. ex Korsh.
- Crambe feuilleei A.Santos ex Prina & Mart.-Laborde
- Crambe filiformis Jacq.
- Crambe fruticosa L.f.
- Crambe gigantea (Ceballos & Ortuño) Bramwell
- Crambe gomeraea Webb ex Christ
- Crambe gordjagini Sprygin & Popov
- Crambe grandiflora DC.
- Crambe grossheimii I.I.Khalilov
- Crambe hedgei I.I.Khalilov
- Crambe hispanica L.
- Crambe juncea M.Bieb.
- Crambe kilimandscharica O.E.Schulz
- Crambe koktebelica (Junge) N.Busch
- Crambe kralikii Coss.
- Crambe laevigata DC. ex Christ
- Crambe maritima L.
- Crambe microcarpa A.Santos
- Crambe orientalis L.
- Crambe pinnatifida W.T.Aiton
- Crambe pritzelii Bolle
- Crambe scaberrima Webb ex Bramwell
- Crambe schugnana Korsh.
- Crambe scoparia Svent.
- Crambe sinuatodentata Hochst. & G.W.Schimp.
- Crambe steveniana Rupr.
- Crambe strigosa L'Hér.
- Crambe sventenii Pett. ex Bramwell & Sunding
- Crambe tamadabensis Prina & Marrero Rodr.
- Crambe tataria Sebeók
- Crambe × tchalenkoae Popovich & Zernov
- Crambe wildpretii Prina & Bramwell
