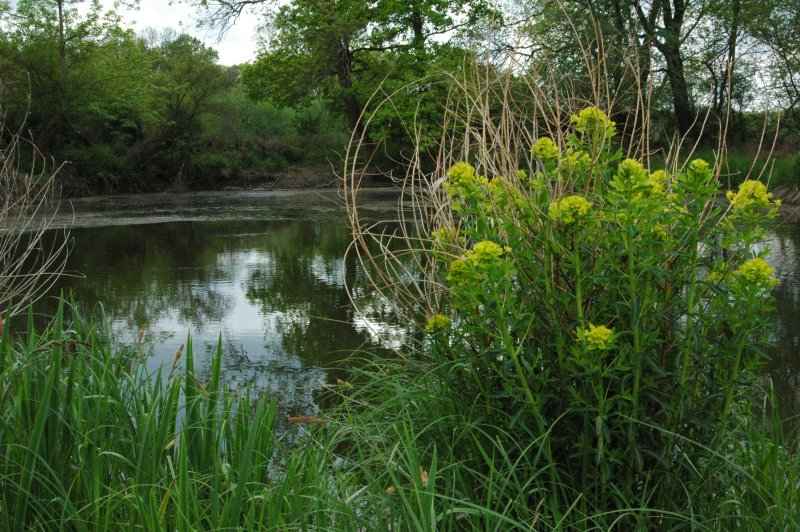

Conservation status
- Least Concern (IUCN 3.1)

Scientific classification
- Kingdom: Plantae
- Clade: Tracheophytes
- Clade: Angiosperms
- Clade: Eudicots
- Clade: Rosids
- Order: Malpighiales
- Family: Euphorbiaceae
- Genus: Euphorbia
- Species: E. palustris

Binomial name
- Euphorbia palustris L.

Synonyms
- Euphorbia brachiata Jan [Invalid]; Euphorbia palustris var. angustifolia Pers.; Euphorbia sauliana Boreau ex Boiss.; Galarhoeus palustris (L.) Haw.; Tithymalus fruticosus Gilib. [Invalid]; Tithymalus palustris (L.) Garsault [Invalid],

= Euphorbia palustris =

Species of flowering plant

Euphorbia palustris, the marsh spurge or marsh euphorbia, is a species of flowering plant in the family Euphorbiaceae, native to marshland throughout much of mainland Europe and western Asia. It is an herbaceous perennial growing to 90 cm (35 in) tall and wide, with narrow leaves turning red and yellow in autumn, and persistent, bright acid yellow flower-heads (cyathia), 15 cm (6 in) across, in spring.

It was published and first described by Carl Linnaeus in his book, Species Plantarum on page 462 in 1753.

It prefers permanently moist conditions in full sun, hence the common name "marsh spurge" and the Latin specific epithet palustris, "of marshland". It is thought to be an ideal plant for gardening because it has a different colour for almost all of the seasons.

Euphorbia palustris has gained the Royal Horticultural Society's Award of Garden Merit.

Like all euphorbias, all parts of the plant are toxic if ingested, and cut stems produce an irritant sticky sap.
