= Erucic acid =

22-Carbon monounsaturated fatty acid

Names
- Preferred IUPAC name (13Z)-Docos-13-enoic acid
- Other names C22:1 (Lipid numbers)

Identifiers
CAS Number	112-86-7
3D model (JSmol)	Interactive image
Beilstein Reference	1728049
ChEBI	CHEBI:28792
ChEMBL	ChEMBL1173380
ChemSpider	4444561
ECHA InfoCard	100.003.647
EC Number	204-011-3
Gmelin Reference	177365
KEGG	C08316
PubChem CID	5281116
UNII	075441GMF2
CompTox Dashboard (EPA)	DTXSID8026931
- InChI: InChI=1S/C22H42O2/c1-2-3-4-5-6-7-8-9-10-11-12-13-14-15-16-17-18-19-20-21-22(23)24/h9-10H,2-8,11-21H2,1H3,(H,23,24)/b10-9- Key: DPUOLQHDNGRHBS-KTKRTIGZSA-N; InChI=1/C22H42O2/c1-2-3-4-5-6-7-8-9-10-11-12-13-14-15-16-17-18-19-20-21-22(23)24/h9-10H,2-8,11-21H2,1H3,(H,23,24)/b10-9- Key: DPUOLQHDNGRHBS-KTKRTIGZBD
- SMILES: O=C(O)CCCCCCCCCCC\C=C/CCCCCCCC

Properties
Chemical formula	C_{22}H_{42}O_{2}
Molar mass	338.576 g·mol^{−1}
Appearance	White waxy solid
Density	0.860 g/cm^{3}
Melting point	33.8 °C (92.8 °F; 306.9 K)
Boiling point	381.5 °C (718.7 °F; 654.6 K) (decomposes)
Solubility in water	Insoluble
Solubility in methanol and ethanol	Soluble

Hazards
- GHS labelling
Pictograms	(GHS07: Exclamation mark)
Signal word	Warning
Hazard statements	H315, H319, H335
Precautionary statements	P261, P264, P271, P280, P302+P352, P304+P340, P305+P351+P338, P312, P321, P332+P313, P337+P313, P362, P403+P233, P405, P501
Flash point	349.9 °C (661.8 °F; 623.0 K)
- Except where otherwise noted, data are given for materials in their standard state (at 25 °C [77 °F], 100 kPa). verify (what is ?) Infobox references

Erucic acid (EA) is a monounsaturated omega-9 fatty acid, denoted 22:1ω9. It has the chemical formula: CH_{_{3}}(CH_{2})_{7}CH=CH(CH_{2})_{11}CO_{2}H. It is prevalent in wallflower seed and other plants in the family Brassicaceae, with a reported content of 20 to 54% in high erucic acid rapeseed oil and 42% in mustard oil. Erucic acid is also known as cis-13-docosenoic acid and the trans isomer is known as brassidic acid. Cetoleic acid is a positional isomer of erucic acid.

== Uses ==
Erucic acid is a precursor to brassylic acid, a C13-dicarboxylic acid that is used to make specialty polyamides and polyesters. The conversion entails ozonolysis, which selectively cleaves the C=C bond in erucic acid:

CH_{3}(CH_{2})_{7}CH=CH(CH_{2})_{11}CO_{2}H + O_{3} + 0.5 O_{2} → CH_{3}(CH_{2})_{7}CO_{2}H + HO_{2}C(CH_{2})_{11}CO_{2}H

Amides of erucic acid are used as lubricants and surfactants.

Hydrogenation of erucic acid gives behenyl alcohol, CH_{3}(CH_{2})_{21}OH, a pour point depressant (enabling liquids to flow at a lower temperature), and which can be made into silver behenate, for use in photography.

== Sources of erucic acid ==
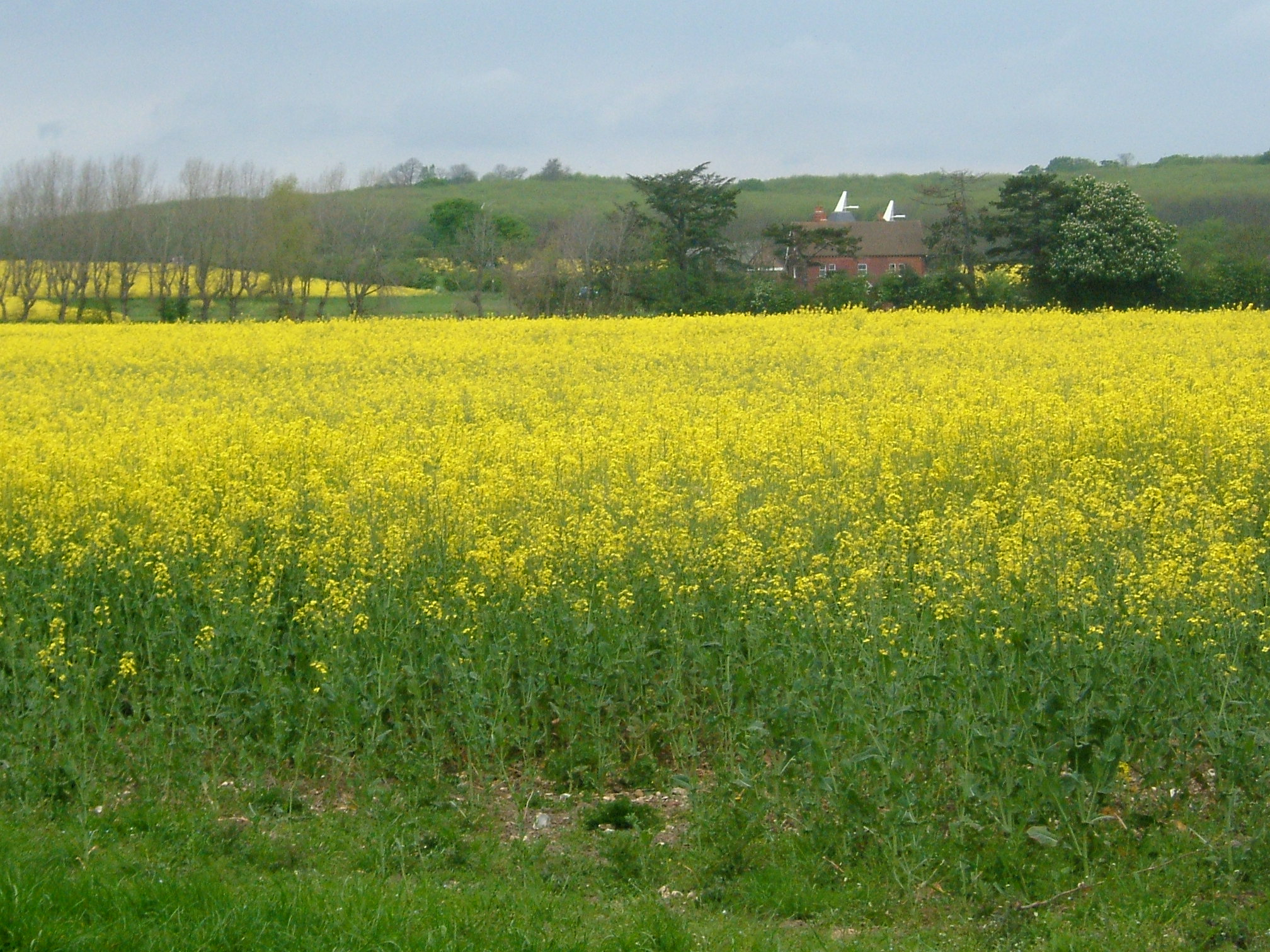
The seed oil of the rape plant is rich in erucic acid.

The name erucic means "of or pertaining to Eruca", which is a genus of flowering plants in the family Brassicaceae. The genus includes colewort (E. sativa), which today is better known as arugula (US) or rocket (UK).

Erucic acid is produced naturally (together with other fatty acids) across a great range of green plants, but especially so in members of the genus Brassica. For industrial purposes and production of erucic acid, rapeseed is used; for food purposes a 'low-erucic acid rapeseed' (LEAR) has been developed (canola), which contains fats derived from oleic acid instead of erucic acid.

== Biochemistry ==
Erucic acid is produced by elongation of oleic acid via oleoyl-coenzyme A and malonyl-CoA. Erucic acid is broken down into shorter-chain fatty acids in the human liver by the long-chain acyl CoA dehydrogenase enzyme.

== Health effects ==
As early as 1977, the use of rapeseed oil was deemed safe as a food additive in the United States.

In 2003, Food Standards Australia set a provisional tolerable daily intake (PTDI) for an average adult of about 500 mg/day of erucic acid, extrapolated based on "the level that is associated with increased myocardial lipidosis in nursing pigs":

There is a 120-fold safety margin between this level and the level that is associated with increased myocardial lipidosis in nursing pigs. The dietary exposure assessment has concluded that the majority of exposure to erucic acid by the general population would come from the consumption of colza oil (rapeseed oil, but not from the cultivar developed to produce canola oil). The dietary intake of erucic acid by an individual consuming at the average level is well below the PTDI; therefore, there is no cause for concern in terms of public health and safety. However, the individual consuming at a high level has the potential to approach the PTDI. This would be particularly so if the level of erucic acid in colza oil were to exceed 2% of the total fatty acids.

Food-grade rapeseed oil (also known as canola oil, rapeseed 00 oil, low erucic acid rapeseed oil, LEAR oil, and rapeseed canola-equivalent oil) is regulated to a maximum of 2% erucic acid by weight in the US and Europe.
