= Pumpkin seed =

Seeds of pumpkin and similar squashes

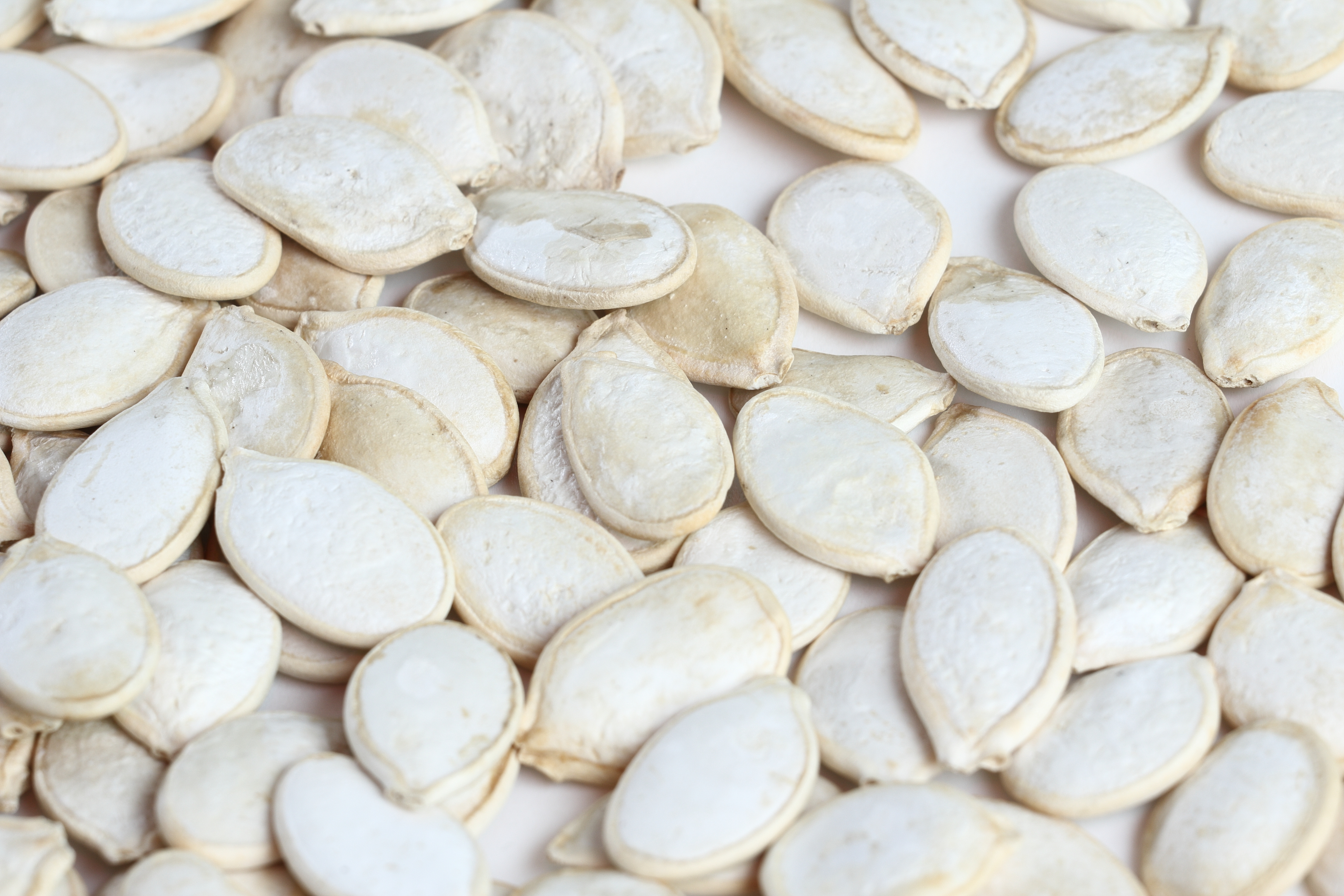
Dried pumpkin seeds in husks

A pumpkin seed, also known as a pepita (from the Mexican Spanish: pepita de calabaza, 'little seed of squash'), is the edible seed of a pumpkin or certain other cultivars of squash. The seeds are typically flat and oval with two axes of symmetry, have a white outer husk, and are light green after the husk is removed. Some pumpkin cultivars are huskless and are grown only for their edible seed. The seeds are nutrient- and calorie-rich, with an especially high content of fat (particularly linoleic acid and oleic acid), protein, dietary fiber, and numerous micronutrients. Pumpkin seed can refer either to the hulled kernel or unhulled whole seed, and most commonly refers to the roasted end product used as a snack.

== Cuisine ==
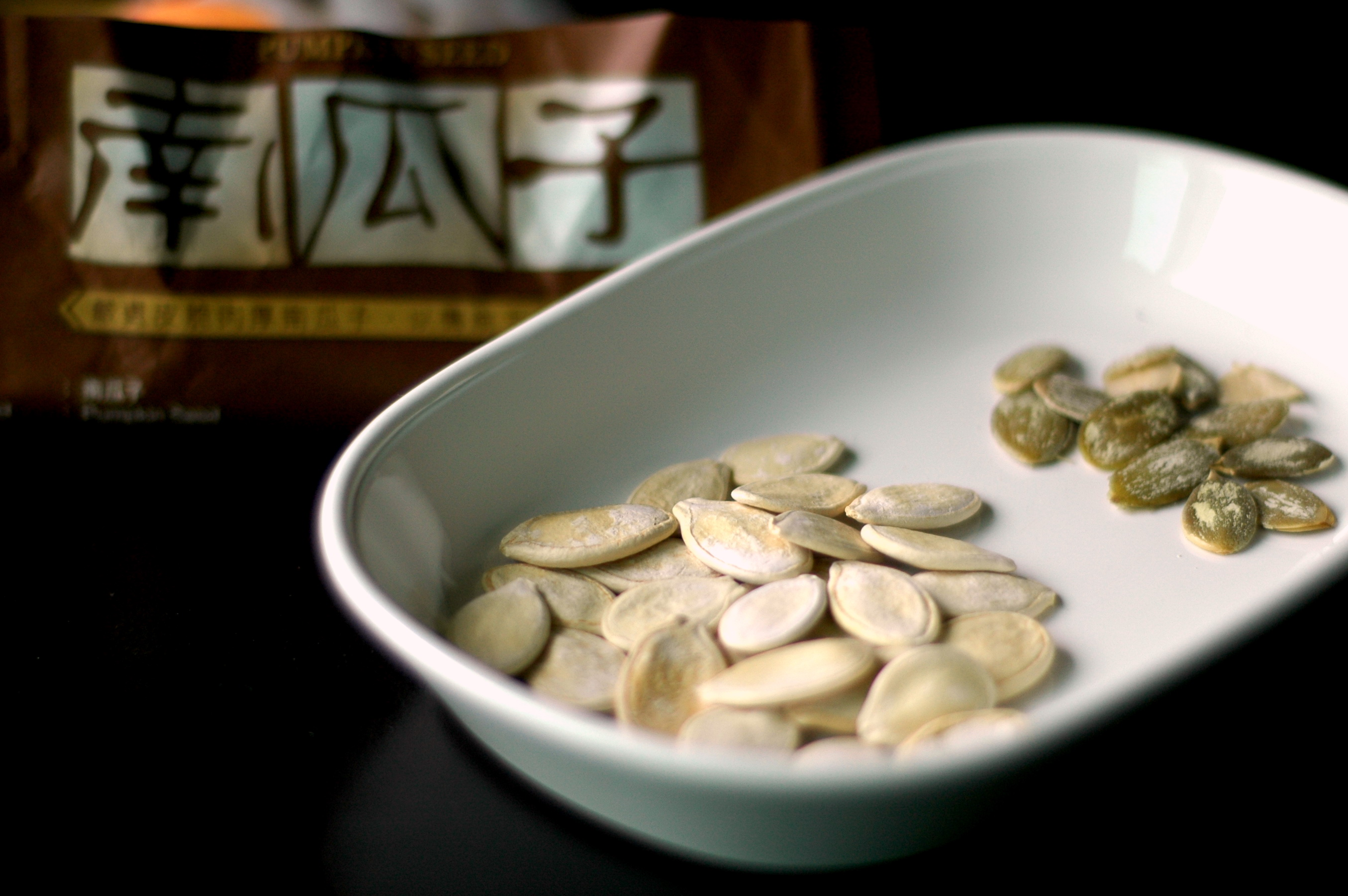
Unhulled vs. hulled pumpkin seeds

Pumpkin seeds are a common ingredient in Mexican cuisine and are also roasted and served as a snack. They are a commercially produced and distributed packaged snack, like sunflower seeds, available year-round. Pepitas are known in the US by their Spanish name (usually shortened) and are typically salted and sometimes spiced after roasting.

The earliest known evidence of the domestication of Cucurbita dates back 8,000–10,000 years ago, predating the domestication of other crops such as maize and common beans in the region by about 4,000 years. Changes in fruit shape and color indicate that intentional breeding of C. pepo occurred no later than 8,000 years ago. The process to develop the agricultural knowledge of crop domestication took place over 5,000–6,500 years in Mesoamerica. Squash was domesticated first, with maize second, followed by beans, all becoming part of the Three Sisters agricultural system.

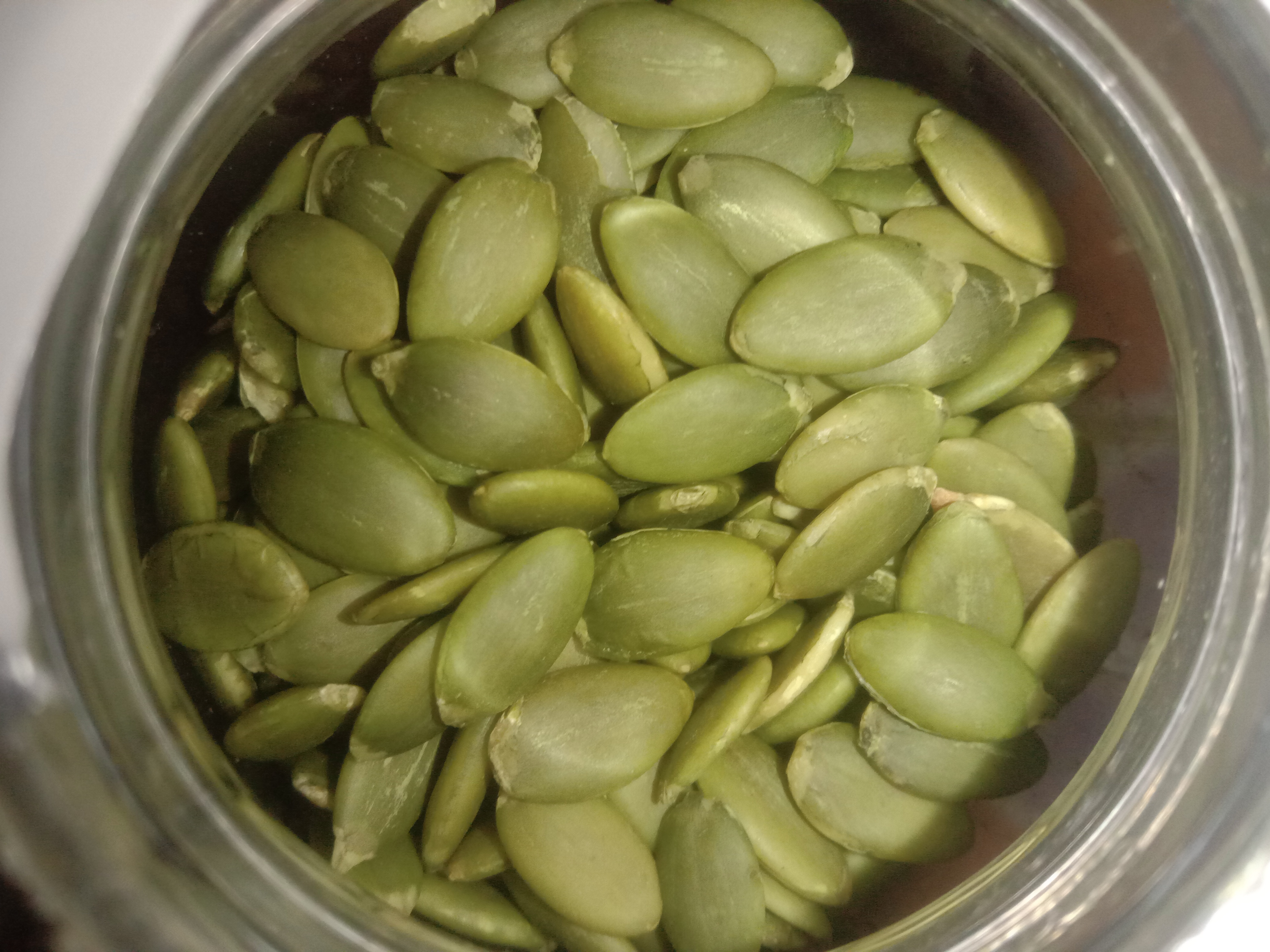
Hulled pumpkin seeds

As an ingredient in mole dishes, they are known in Mexican Spanish as pipián. A salsa made of pumpkin seeds and known as sikil pak is a traditional dish of the Yucatán. A Mexican snack using pepitas in an artisan fashion is referred to as pepitoría. Lightly roasted, salted, unhulled pumpkin seeds are popular in Greece with the descriptive name πασατέμπο, pasatémbo, from Italian: passatempo, lit. 'pastime'.

The pressed oil of the roasted seeds of the Styrian oil pumpkin (Cucurbita pepo subsp. pepo var. 'styriaca') is also used in Central and Eastern Europe cuisine. Pumpkin seeds can also be made into a nut butter. Pumpkin seeds can also be steeped in neutral alcohol, which is then distilled to produce an eau de vie.

== Nutrition ==
Pumpkin and squash seed kernels, roasted, with salt added
Nutritional value per 100 g (3.5 oz)
- Energy: 2,401 kJ (574 kcal)
- Carbohydrates: 14.71 g
- Sugars: 1.29 g
- Dietary fiber: 6.5 g
- Fat: 49.05 g
- Saturated: 8.544 g
- Monounsaturated: 15.734
- Polyunsaturated: 19.856
- Protein: 29.84 g
Vitamins and minerals
Vitamins	Quantity %DV^{†}
Thiamine (B1)	6% 0.07 mg
Riboflavin (B2)	12% 0.15 mg
Niacin (B3)	28% 4.43 mg
Pantothenic acid (B5)	11% 0.57 mg
Vitamin B6	6% 0.1 mg
Folate (B9)	14% 57 μg
Vitamin C	7% 6.5 mg
Vitamin E	4% 0.56 mg
Vitamin K	4% 4.5 μg
Minerals	Quantity %DV^{†}
Calcium	4% 52 mg
Iron	45% 8.07 mg
Magnesium	131% 550 mg
Manganese	195% 4.49 mg
Phosphorus	94% 1174 mg
Potassium	26% 788 mg
Sodium	11% 256 mg
Zinc	69% 7.64 mg
- Other constituents: Quantity
- Water: 2.0 g
- Link to USDA Database entry
- ^{†}Percentages estimated using US recommendations for adults, except for potassium, which is estimated based on expert recommendation from the National Academies.

Dried, roasted pumpkin seeds are 2% water, 49% fat, 15% carbohydrates, and 30% protein (table). In a reference amount of 100 g (3.5 oz), the seeds are energy-dense (2,401 kJ or 574 kcal), and a rich source (20% of the Daily Value, DV, or higher) of protein, dietary fiber, niacin, iron, zinc, manganese, magnesium, potassium, and phosphorus (table). The seeds are a moderate source (10–19% DV) of riboflavin, folate, pantothenic acid, and sodium (table). Major fatty acids in pumpkin seeds are linoleic acid and oleic acid, with palmitic acid and stearic acid in lesser amounts (source in table).

=== Oil ===
Pumpkin seed oil, a culinary specialty in and important export commodity of Central Europe, is used in cuisine as a salad and cooking oil.

The following are ranges of fatty acid content in C. maxima pepitas:

n:unsat	Fatty acid name	Percentage range
(14:0)	Myristic acid	0.003–0.056
(16:0)	Palmitic acid	1.6–8.0
(16:1)	Palmitoleic acid	0.02–0.10
(18:0)	Stearic acid	0.81–3.21
(18:1)	Oleic acid	3.4–19.4
(18:2)	Linoleic acid	5.1–20.4
(18:3)	Linolenic acid	0.06–0.22
(20:0)	Arachidic acid	0.06–0.21
(20:1)	Gadoleic acid	0–0.035
(22:0)	Behenic acid	0.02–0.12

The total unsaturated fatty acid concentration ranged from 9% to 21% of the pepita. The total fat content ranged from 11% to 52%. Based on the quantity of alpha-tocopherol extracted in the oil, the vitamin E content of twelve C. maxima cultivar seeds ranged from 4 to 19 mg/100 g of pepita.

== Traditional medicine ==
Pumpkin seeds were once used as an anthelmintic in traditional medicine to expel tapeworms parasites, such as Taenia tapeworms. This led to the seeds being listed in the United States Pharmacopoeia as an antiparasitic from 1863 until 1936.

== Market ==
Due to their versatility as a food product ingredient or snack, pumpkin seeds are projected to grow in sales by 13% annually and reach $631 million from 2020 to 2024.

== See also ==
- Cucurbitacin
- Cucurbitin
- Egusi
- List of edible seeds
- List of squash and pumpkin dishes
