= Dichromatic =

Dichromatic may refer to:

- Dichromacy, a form of color-blindness in which only two light wavelengths are distinguished rather than the usual three
- Dichromatic, describing an optical device which splits light into two parts according to its wavelength: a form of dichroism
- A form of polymorphism (biology), typical in sexual dimorphism, in which two phenotypes have different colouration or ornamentation.
- Dichromatic reflectance model
- Dichromatism: the property of a substance that changes hue due to change in its concentration or the thickness of a layer.

== See also ==
- Chromatic
