= Diffraction standard =

Crystal used to calibrate an x-ray spectrometer

In crystallography, a diffraction standard, or calibration crystal, is a crystal used to calibrate an X-ray spectrometer to an absolute X-ray energy scale. A range of materials may be used including quartz or silicon crystals. There are also reports of crystals of silver behenate or silver stearate having been used for this purpose.
