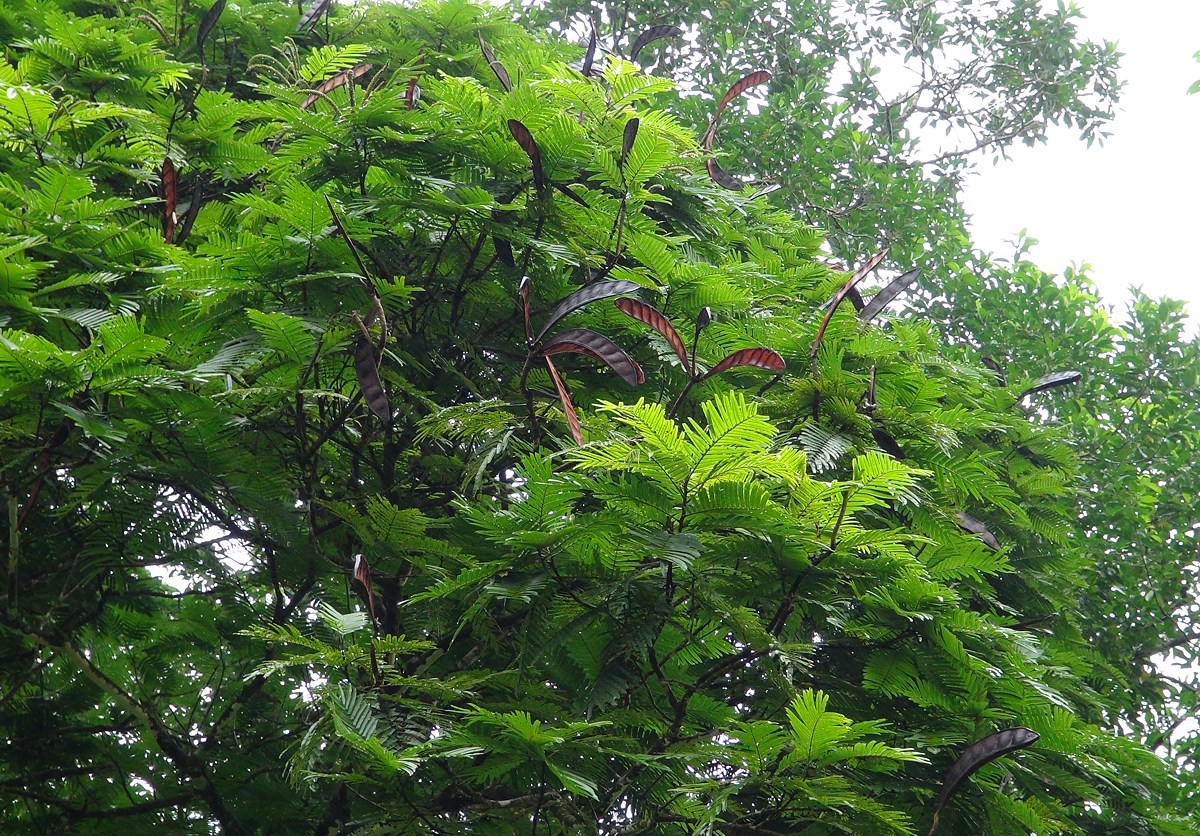
- Pentaclethra macroloba tree in Costa Rica

Conservation status
- Least Concern (IUCN 3.1)

Scientific classification
- Kingdom: Plantae
- Clade: Tracheophytes
- Clade: Angiosperms
- Clade: Eudicots
- Clade: Rosids
- Order: Fabales
- Family: Fabaceae
- Subfamily: Caesalpinioideae
- Clade: Mimosoid clade
- Genus: Pentaclethra
- Species: P. macroloba

Binomial name
- Pentaclethra macroloba (Willd.) Kuntze

Synonyms
- Acacia macroloba Willd. Mimosa macroloba (Willd.) Poir. Acacia aspidioides G.Mey. Pentaclethra filamentosa Benth. Pentaclethra brevipila Benth. Cailliea macrostachya Steud. Dichrostachys macrostachya (Steud.) Walp. Entada werbaeana J.Presl

= Pentaclethra macroloba =

Species of legume

Pentaclethra macroloba is a large and common leguminous tree in the genus Pentaclethra native to the wet tropical areas of the northern Neotropics, which can form monocultural stands in some seasonally flooded habitats. It has giant, bipinnate leaves shaped like feathers. It uses seed dispersal by water to establish itself in new areas, having floating seeds that are left behind after the waters recede after floods or tides. It has hard timber which is not very resistant to rot in the tropics, but it can be treated, has a pretty pink-red colour when dry, and has a number of uses. Oil used in cosmetics is extracted from the large seeds. In the northern Amazon region the bark is used in herbal medicine as an antivenom, and in the Guianas the bark has been used as a fish poison. Despite their toxicity, the seeds are eaten by variegated squirrels, parrots and macaws, and serve as the nurseries of the larvae of the moth Carmenta surinamensis.

== Etymology and local names ==
The name Pentaclethra is derived from Ancient Greek, penta meaning 'five', and cleithro meaning 'bolt', which alludes to the five imbricate sepals and five petals joined at their bases; this defines the species of the genus.

The tree is popularly known as pracaxi in the Amazon region of Brazil. In the Arawak language it is known as koroballi, in Sranantongo it is called kroebara. In Spanish it is called gavilán or quebracho.

== Description ==
Pentaclethra macroloba is a tree which can vary in height and size depending on distribution. In Costa Rica it grows to the greatest dimensions and is usually a canopy tree which reaches a trunk diameter of 130 centimetres (51 in), and heights of 30–40 metres (98–131 ft). In Brazil the average height is said to be approximately 14 metres (46 ft), and in the eastern Guianas it is said to grow up to 25 metres (82 ft). In these areas it is a subcanopy tree. This may be due to infraspecific variation.

The canopy or crown is dense and broad.

The twigs are brownish-red, when they are young they are covered in a puberulous indumentum. The twigs are without spines. The 0.7–0.8 cm stipules are deciduous, linear or hair-like.

=== Leaves ===
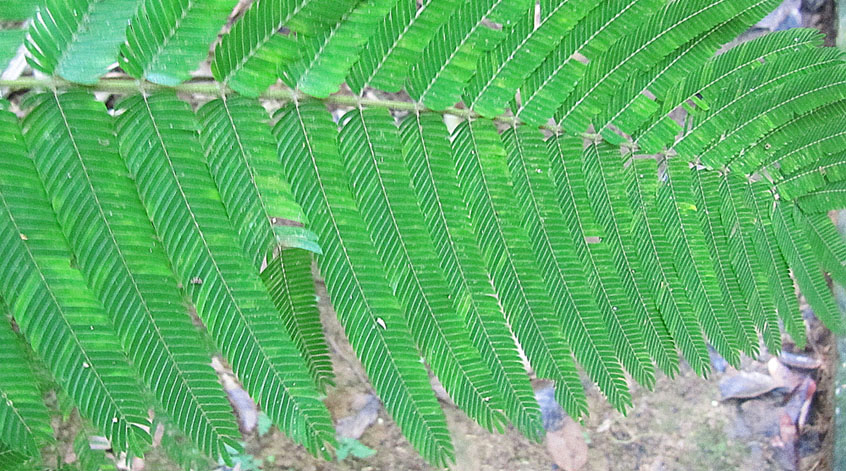
Detail of a leaf

The large leaves are twice compound, arranged in a spiral on the stems. The leaf blades, which can be up to 30 centimetres (12 in) long, consist of 15 to 20 pairs of first-order pinnae 2–10 centimetres (1–4 in) long, alternately placed on a cylindrical rachis. The petiole is 1–5 cm long, the main rachis is 11–30 cm, when young they are covered in a brown puberulous indumentum. The rachis is angular in profile, and grooved longitudinally on the upper side. The rachillae hava a 1mm-long hinge. There are 30 to 50 pairs of second-order leaflets which are leathery in texture, narrowly falcate, with a pilose to glabrescent indumentum, and multiple linear ribs. Among mimosoids, Pentaclethra are unusual in that they lack nectar glands on the rachis, or anywhere on the leaves.

=== Flowers ===
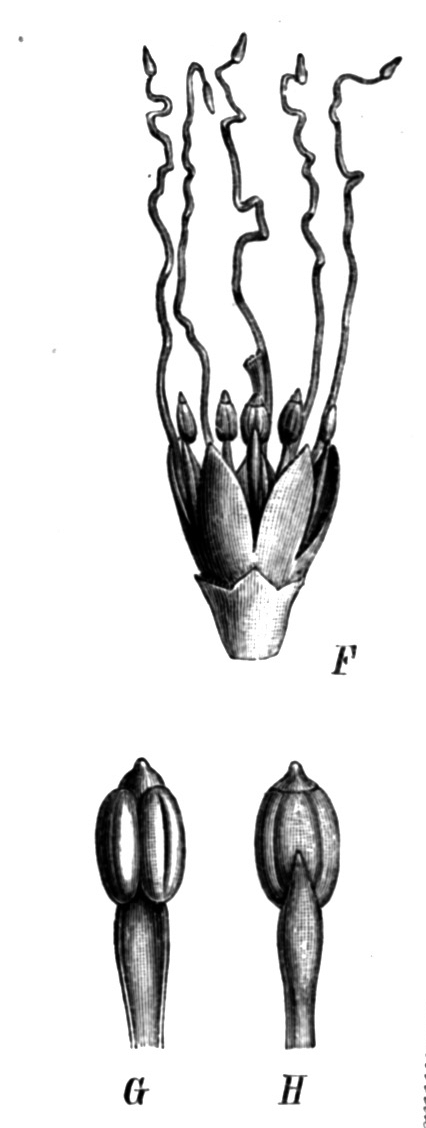
Illustration of a flower, note the long staminodes

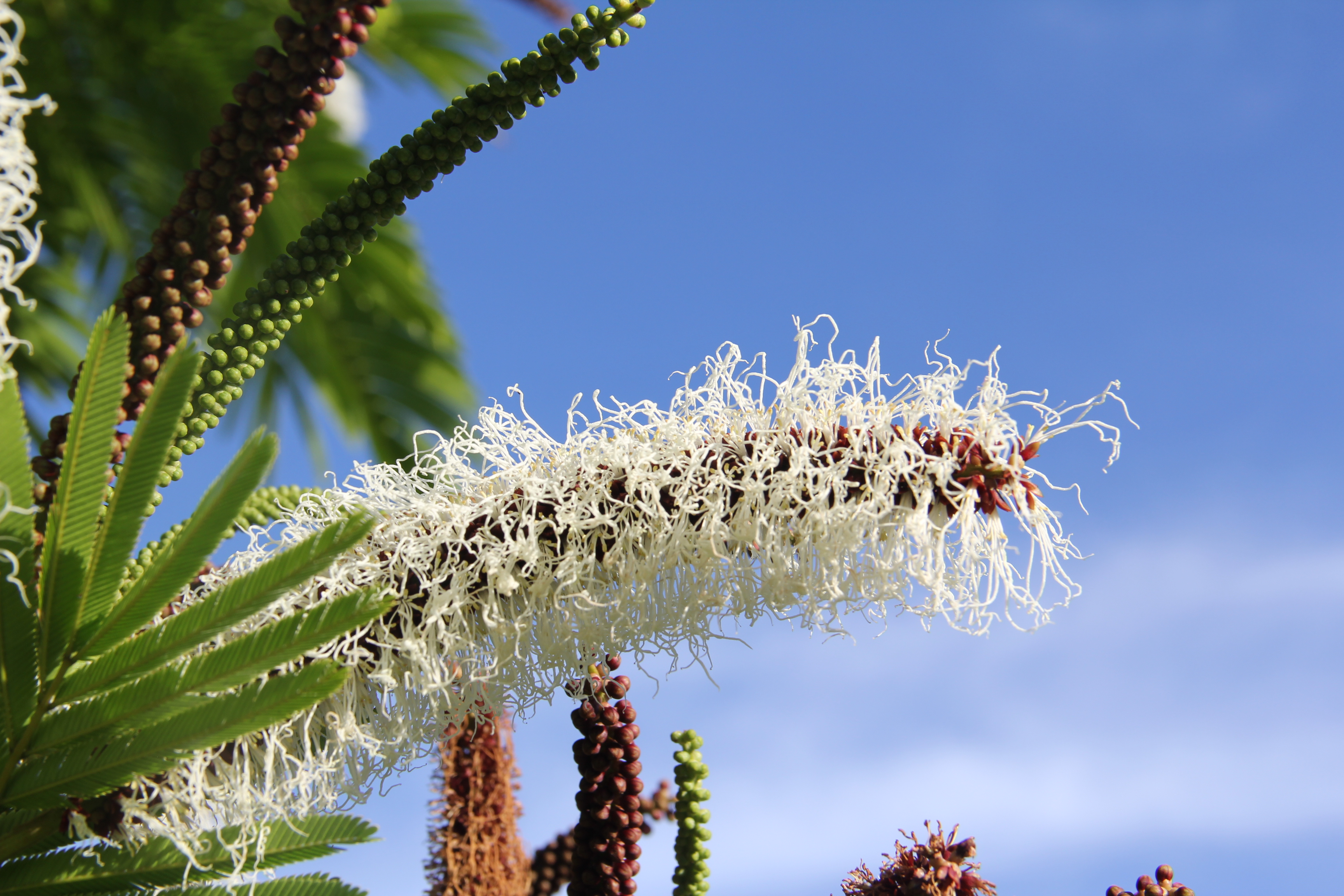
An inflorescence displaying the staminodes.

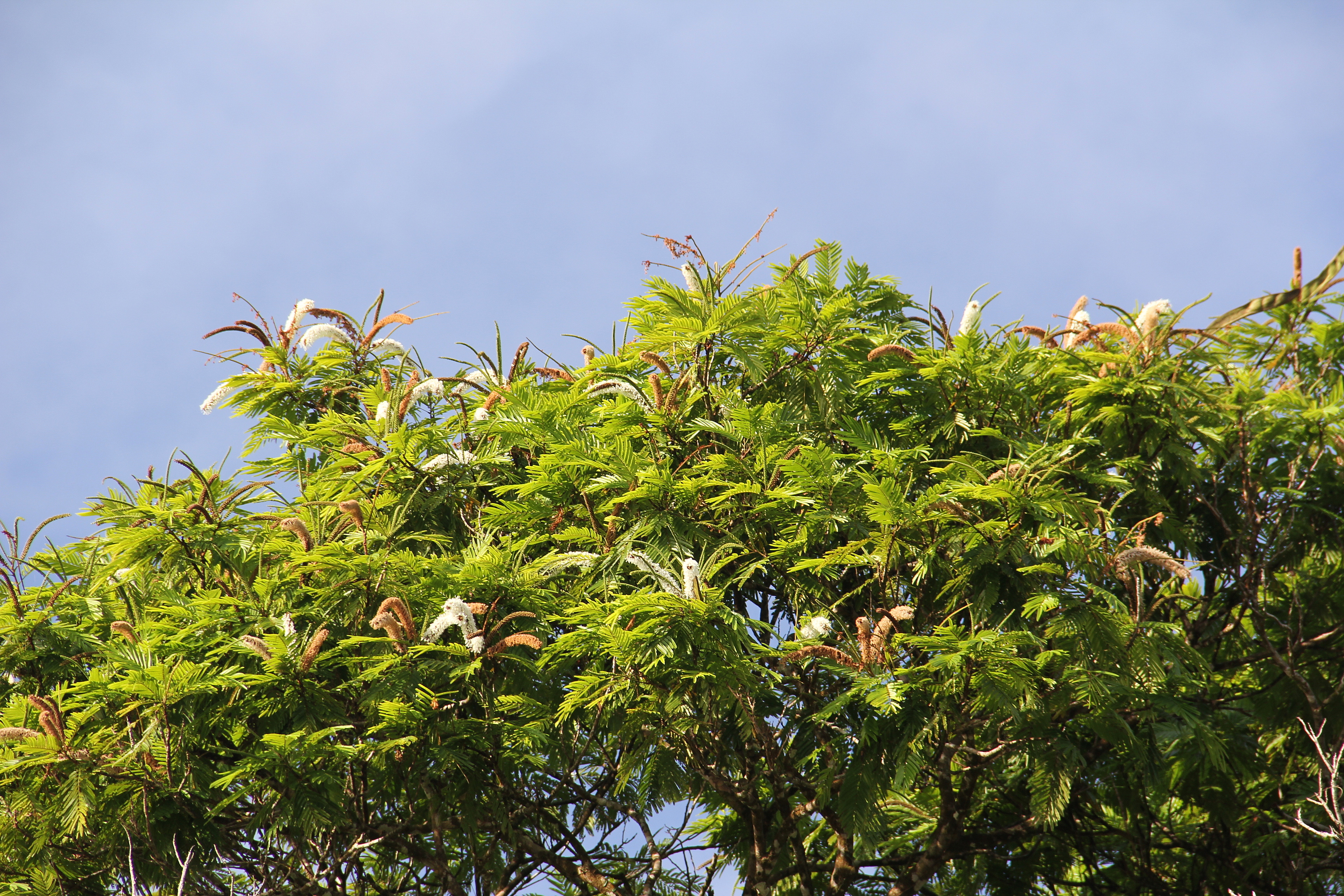
The flower spikes are held above the foliage

The inflorescence is a 10 to 25 cm, most often 20 cm long spike, with approximately 320 flowers, each one perfect and complete (containing all the functional male and female parts). The rachis is 15–20 cm long and has 1–5 cm peduncle. The spikes are terminal or subterminal on the branches. Developing spikes are covered in a reddish-brown pubescence.

The about 2 cm sessile flower has five petals and is actinomorphic. It is scented. The greenish-brown calyx is gamosepalous with the sepals being imbricate (having overlapping edges), and about 2 cm long with a joint base and five free lacinia (narrowly-incised segments between them). The corolla consists of five 4–5 millimetres (0.16–0.20 in) long, thick, free (not connate) petals. A Brazilian study found the petals are uniformly dark red at the base and yellow at the apex in their specimens. A Costa Rican document describes them as purple, becoming greenish towards their tips. There are ten free stamens, about 7mm long, arranged in two distinct groups (a 'heteromorphic' androecium). Their anthers carry a conspicuous apical gland and five long (2.5 cm), white staminodes, which have filaments with a small appendage at their terminal ends. The anthers are dorsifixed -this means a pair are fused together along their sides, like two hot-dog buns stuck together, with the filament attached to the centre of the pair. The anthers open longitudinally when they mature and dry, dispersing pollen grains as monads. The female part of the flower has a single carpel capped by a chamber-like shaped stigma, this carpel has an unilocular ovary containing about eight ovules in its upper portion. There is a disc-shaped nectary at the base of the ovary.

The apical gland mentioned above is a rather unique and mysterious anatomical feature found only in the anthers of mimosids and related legumes. Such glands occur in four distinct forms, and the Pentaclethra form is unique to this genus, distinguished by a dorsal furrow in the middle of the anther, and a ventral conical structure similar to a food body or an osmophore.

=== Fruit, seeds and seedlings ===
Despite producing hundreds of flowers per inflorescence, each spike only produces a few fruit, which is a pod (or bean). These are held erect above the foliage and branches. The pod is (16.1-) 30 to 38 (-45.2)cm in length, (3.3-) 4.1 to 6 (-7.3)cm in width, and 0.8 to 1.1 cm thick. It is coloured greenish when fresh, and dark brownish-grey when dry. The shape is falcate or linear-spatulate and flattened, with the greatest width above the middle, the base being attenuated truncate and the apex being rounded. The pod is woody, and it opens by elastic dehiscence from the apex to the base. It has longitudinal veins. The dorsal suture is up to 1.1 cm broad and thickened, the ventral suture is up to 0.8 cm thick. As the seedpod dried tension builds until the two valves twist open suddenly when the suture cracks open. The pod has three to eight seeds, more often four to six.

The large and flat seeds measure from 3.8 to 5 cm, exceptionally 6.1 cm, in length, and 2.5 to 3.5 cm, exceptionally 5.7 cm in width. The form is lens-like to spoon-shaped or deltoid, or ovoid to elliptical, and laterally flattened. They are coloured dark brown. The seeds do not have arils. The cotyledons are composed anatomically of thin-walled parenchyma cells with various oil cells.

When the seeds germinate, thick and large, green-coloured cotyledons open at the soil surface, and send up a shoot, called the epicotyl. The cotyledons remain attached to the seedlings and serve as energy reserves for the growing plant. The epicotyl is slightly twisted, it first grows cataphylls that wither and are shed early in the development, and then bears a first pair of alternate eophylls, before developing bipinnate leaves, with leaflets that have waxes and simple trichomes on their upper surface at the margins, and stomata on the bottom surface.

=== Similar species ===
The plant can be recognised as belonging to this species by: not having any spines, bipinnate leaves without nectar glands, inflorescences as large spikes covered in conspicuous white stingy staminodes, and fruit held above the branches, in the shape of a machete, which open with an elastically explosive mechanism from the apex to the base. Its large seeds are recognisable by their more or less lens-like to spoon-shaped form. Taxonomic recognition of saplings of this species is possible in the field through the morphology.

== Distribution ==
According to one 1983 source, it exists in three disjunct populations, one through the lowlands of northeast Venezuela through the Guianas, including Trinidad and Tobago. The second population occurs in western Colombia and Darien Province in eastern Panama. The third is found in western Panama, Costa Rica and Nicaragua.

Another source considers it introduced to Trinidad and Tobago and the Windward Islands.

In Costa Rica and Nicaragua it primarily grows along the eastern coasts. It does not occur in western Nicaragua. The populations in Costa Rica are not disjunct, as it occurs through the central valleys and in certain patches on the western coast. In eastern Panama it is the dominant tree in certain moist, seasonal, swamp forests in coastal areas of the Atlantic. It has been collected in Bocas del Toro and Darién Province.

In Colombia it is only found along the Pacific coast. It is a common tree in northern parts of Brazil. It is found in the states of Acre, Amazonas, Amapá, Pará and Roraima, and perhaps in the state of Mato Grosso.

In the 1993 article Catalogue of the Flowering Plants and Gymnosperms of Peru it was said to occur in the Department of Loreto. This was however based on a voucher specimen, which although having been determined to be P. macroloba in 1993, was re-identified as the species Dimorphandra coccinea in 1997.

== Ecology ==
It grows in lowland forest from sea level to 600 metres above sea level in Costa Rica, and is especially abundant in humid, temporarily inundated rainforests. It is restricted to the lowlands in Panama. It occurs at an altitude of 0-290m in Colombia. In Brazil it is known from the seasonally flooded, closed tropical rainforests known as várzea, in both igapó (inundated forest) habitat and forest on 'terra firme' land. In the Brazilian Amazon River estuary it is the 'hyperdominant' lifeform, forming vast monospecific stands. In the Amazon River estuary the plants are subjected to daily tides. In the wooded floodplains of Mazagão, Brazil, the population density was 18 trees per hectare with a basal area of 49 m2 per hectare. In La Selva Biological Station Pentaclethra macroloba constitutes 40% of the basal area and up to 18% of the stem density in parts of the forest, where it forms monocultural stands.

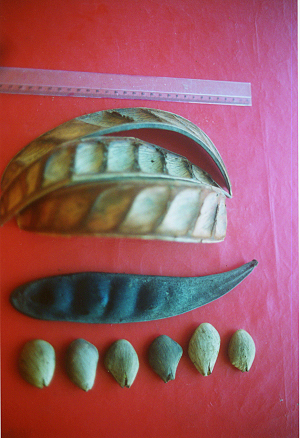
Seed pods and seeds

Different trees synchronize their flowering in the dry season. In Costa Rica flowering starts in March. It is the conspicuous white staminodes which attract pollinators, not the minute petals. It is cross-pollinated. The main visitors to the flowers are wasps, bees and ants. Immature fruits appear during the dry season and ripe fruits in the rainy season. The species is evergreen, showing no specific changes in the leaves throughout the year, despite flooding.

The tree uses at least three methods of seed dispersal. Seeds are mechanically dispersed when mature pods split, popping open during the rainfall. The mechanism works by elastic dehiscence. The seeds are expelled up to ten meters from the parent tree. This is the season when rivers overflow their banks, and the lowland floods. In 2001 the discovery was published that submerged seeds develop air pockets that allow them to float; this was then interpreted as evidence that the species has adaptions for dispersal by water (hydrochory). Dispersal of seeds during daily river flooding and at the peak of the river flood allows the plant to use the receding waters of the tides to transport them long distances. The population density increases with the distance from the normal edge of the inundation. This is believed to be due to the action of the floodwaters during high tide, the floating seeds end up stuck behind fallen branches, buttress roots or other objects, often in great numbers.

Like many leguminous plants, P. macroloba is a nitrogen fixer which forms a symbiotic relationship with Rhizobium, which grows in specialised root nodules. While root nodules are typically found on buried roots, P. macroloba individuals growing in swampy areas produce nodules on aerial roots.

=== Seed predation ===
Gary Hartshorn, a forester at the US World Forestry Center at the time, wrote an account on the species in the 1983 book Costa Rican Natural History, in which he principally theorised as to how the species had become so dominant in the monocultural forests of La Selva Biological Station. The seeds and seedling are conspicuously abundant on the forest floor. One of his assertions was that the seeds are so well-protected by their toxin defences, that they are able to withstand significant seed predation. The seeds are quite poisonous, containing toxic alkaloids and special amino acids. Possibly the most common rodent in the Pentaclethra forests is the spiny pocket mouse Heteromys desmarestianus. An experiment where the mice were exclusively fed the seeds killed them all. Hartshorn noted the presence of the larvae of a wasp-like, clear-winged moth feeding in the seeds, but noted that their presence did not impede germination, and speculated that the opening of the cotyledons at the surface of the soil was perhaps a defensive tactic of the plant, as it exposes the caterpillars to foraging ground insectivores. The seeds are actually heavily predated upon, frequently ten or eleven insect larvae emerge through small holes on the exposed surface of the opened cotyledons. This appears to be primarily caused by the moth Carmenta surinamensis, which was found in 43.6% of the seeds in one study in Costa Rica. This reduces their viability, but does not always kill them.

Hartshorn himself had noted in his earlier thesis paper that grey squirrels (Sciurus variegatoides) and white-crowned parrots (Pionus senilis) feed upon the seeds up in the trees while still in the unopened pods. The animals access the seeds by making a hole in one valve of these pods. A small study which looked at 100 pods found that 22% of the fruit had such holes in them. The animals rarely get all the seeds, but often just take one or few from a pod. Only 5% of the total seed production is consumed before the pods open. These are taken in a rather random manner, with no particular selection apparent. An explanation for this may be that the preferences of the squirrels and parrots are precisely diametrically opposed and they might cancel each other out, but it is also possible that the optimal foraging theory, which would have it that predators select the biggest and easiest to forage seeds, may not apply here, as both animals may be able to tolerate some toxins, they are still susceptible to them, and must limit their intake. The pod damage may hinder the elastic mechanism that flings the seeds away from the tree, thus 22% the pod predation may still be quite significant for the population dynamics. Great green macaws have also been recorded to feed on the seeds.

Capuchin monkeys have a strange and mysterious behaviour, known as 'anointing', in which they periodically rub their bodies with specific objects. On Trinidad the small population of white-fronted capuchins at Bush Bush Wildlife Sanctuary use the pods of P. macroloba to anoint themselves. They pluck a pod from the tree, break it open, and rub themselves with the inner part. These Trinidadian monkeys do this often, and always do it in sight of each other. Afterwards they often eat one or more of the seeds found inside the pod, whether these are ripe or not. Other monkeys avoid the bark and seeds of P. macroloba. Perhaps the monkeys use the seedpods as a curative, or some kind of medicine.

=== Phytosociology ===
In Mazagão, Brazil, it is found growing together with a high frequency of palms and the trees Carapa guianensis, Virola surinamensis, Mora paraensis, Calycophyllum spruceanum, Hevea brasiliensis, Platymiscium ulei, a Licania species, Cedrela odorata, Pterocarpus amazonicus, Symphonia globulifera, Licaria mahuba, Hernandia guianensis and others.

It is a common tree in the Mora excelsa forests of the Guianas and the Orinoco Delta of Venezuela. In this habitat the Mora is the dominant species, and Pentaclethra is a subcanopy tree.

In Central America the species is the dominant canopy tree, growing with Carapa guianensis subdominant in the canopy, and also associated with the palms Astrocaryum alatum and Iriartea gigantea, and the trees Pterocarpus officinalis and Stryphnodendron microstachyum.

== Uses ==
=== Timber ===
The sapwood of the tree is whitish, drying to pink, while the heartwood is reddish brown. The timber has a specific gravity of 0.51–0.61. The timber has commercial value. It is used to make furniture, cabinets and for general construction. The timber is traded as 'gavilán'.

=== Other ===
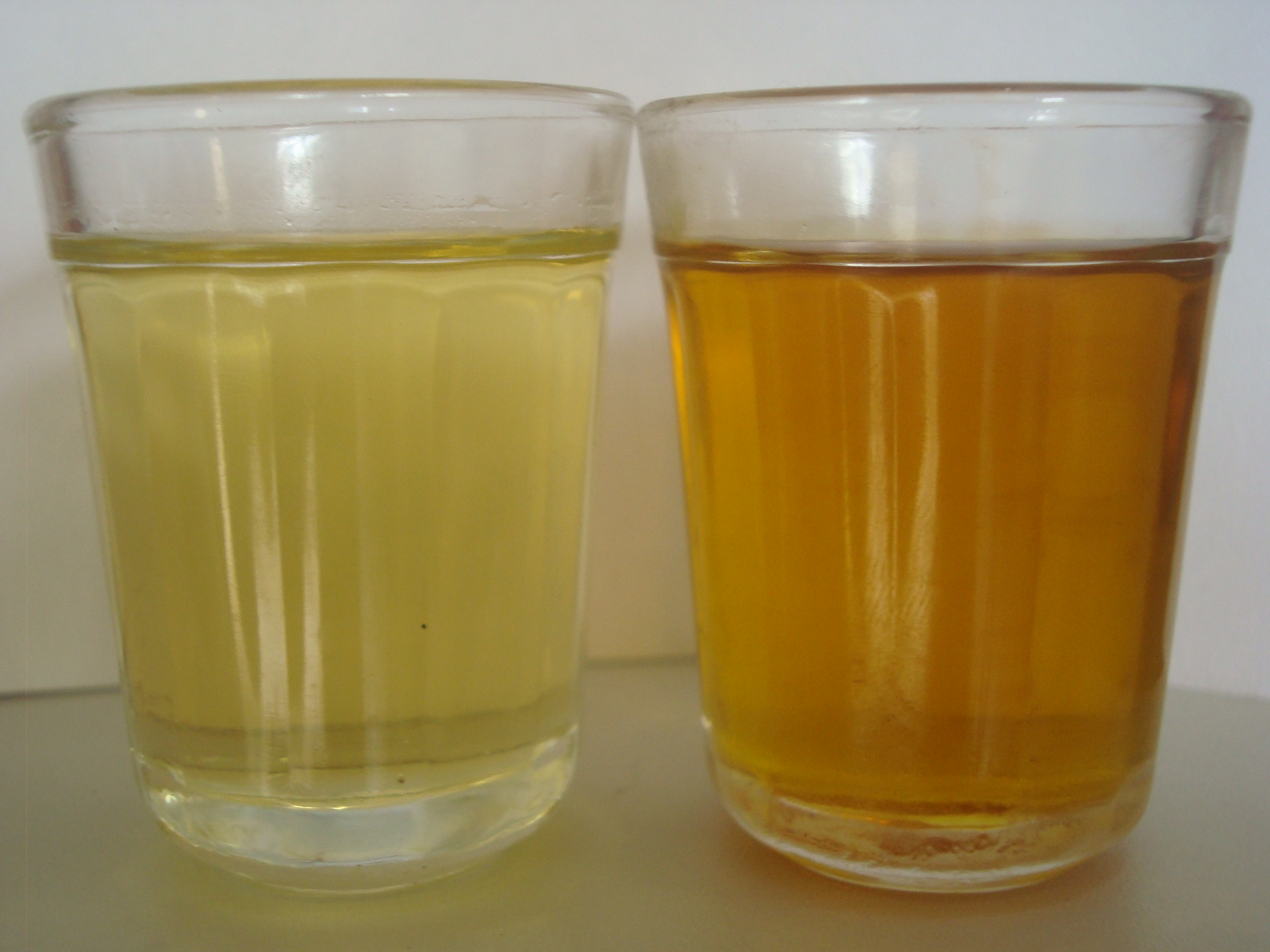
Pracaxi oil

Pracaxi oil, which is extracted from the seeds of P. macroloba, is rich in oleic, linoleic, and behenic acid. It is used as a replacement for synthetic hair conditioners in 'green' cosmetics. Both the bark and seed oil contain the possibly toxic alkaloid paucine. Paucine (caffeoyl-putrescine) is a growth-retardant. In Nigeria the seed of the related African species P. macrophylla is boiled and fermented with Bacillus subtilis, which detoxifies it of paucine. In the Guianas the poisonous bark is used as a fish poison.

Traditional medicinal properties ascribed to this plant species by caboclos (Brazilian Portuguese for 'locals') and various native groups are as an antivenom against snakebites, and as a curative for ulcers and insect bites.

==== Snakebites ====
For snakebites, the dried bark is macerated and applied as a paste to the site of the bite. When Brazilian scientists tested an extract from the dried bark to see if any antivenom effect could be detected, it showed a measurable ability to reduce haemorrhaging in vivo when mixed with the venom and injected into mice. Although plant-based antivenoms are used by many cultures around the world, few have actually been shown to have any positive effect. Because electrophoresis showed that the snake venoms were not being degraded by the extract, which eliminated proteolytic enzymatic activity as the mechanism of action, the Brazilian scientists hypothesised that the effect was caused by an unknown substance with some kind of inhibitory action caused by the binding of the zinc ions required by snake venom metalloproteases to function. Snake venom is a complex mixture of toxic chemicals, however, and not all components of the venoms tested were neutralised. Two years later many of the same researchers had a new article published; this time they had isolated the compounds causing the protective effect, two triterpenoid saponins which they named macrolobin-A and B. Although these compounds do not fully counteract all the venomous effects, they could find use as complements to standard treatment against snakebites, or as molecular models for the development of novel future medicinal compounds.

== Conservation ==
It is a common species where it occurs in the Guianas and Central America.
