= C5H10N2O2 =

The molecular formula C_{5}H_{10}N_{2}O_{2} (molar mass: 130.15 g/mol) may refer to:

- Cucurbitin
- L-687,414
