= Pumpkin seed oil =

Oil from the seeds of pumpkins

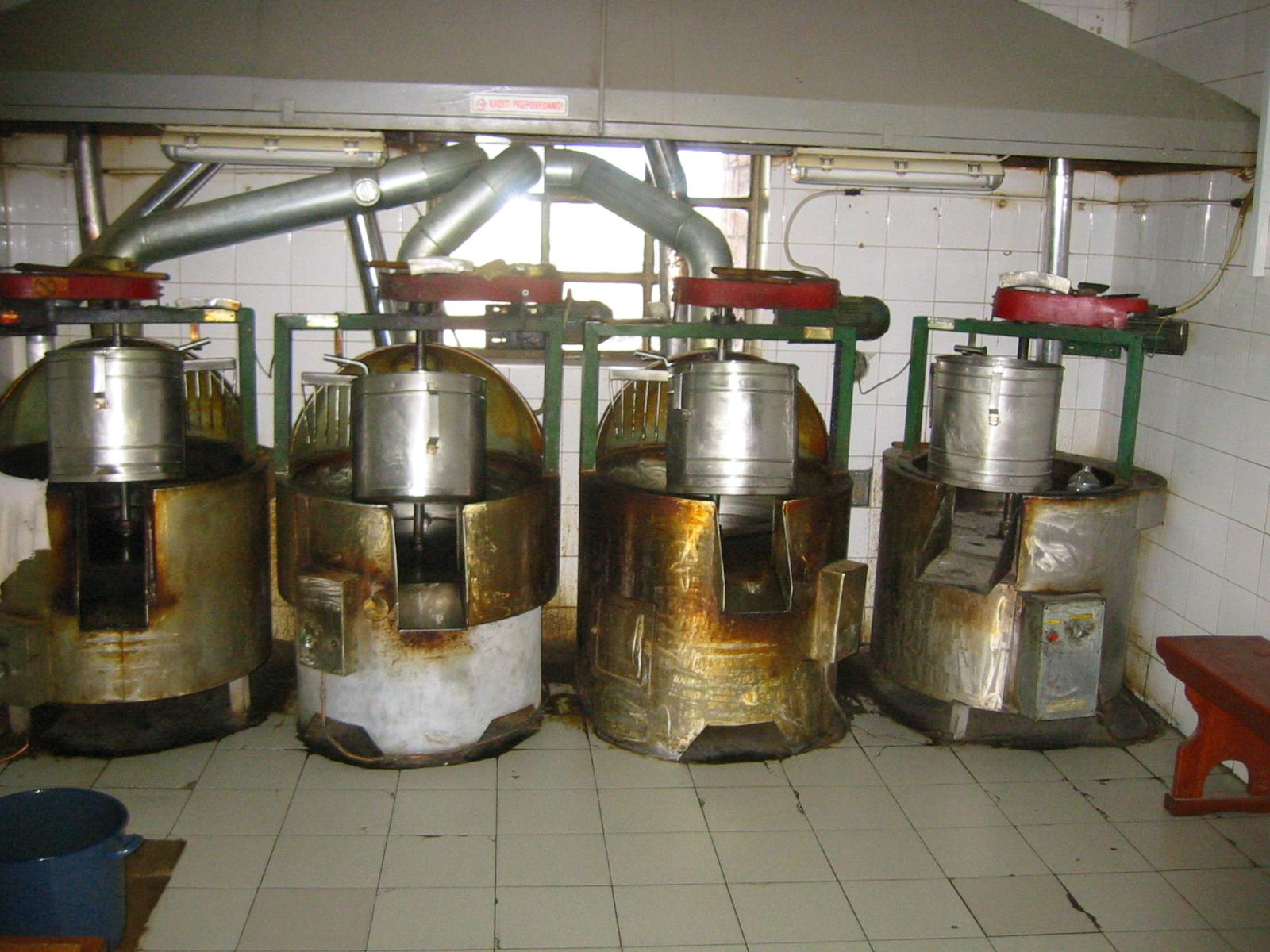
Pumpkin seed oil factory in Prekmurje, Slovenia

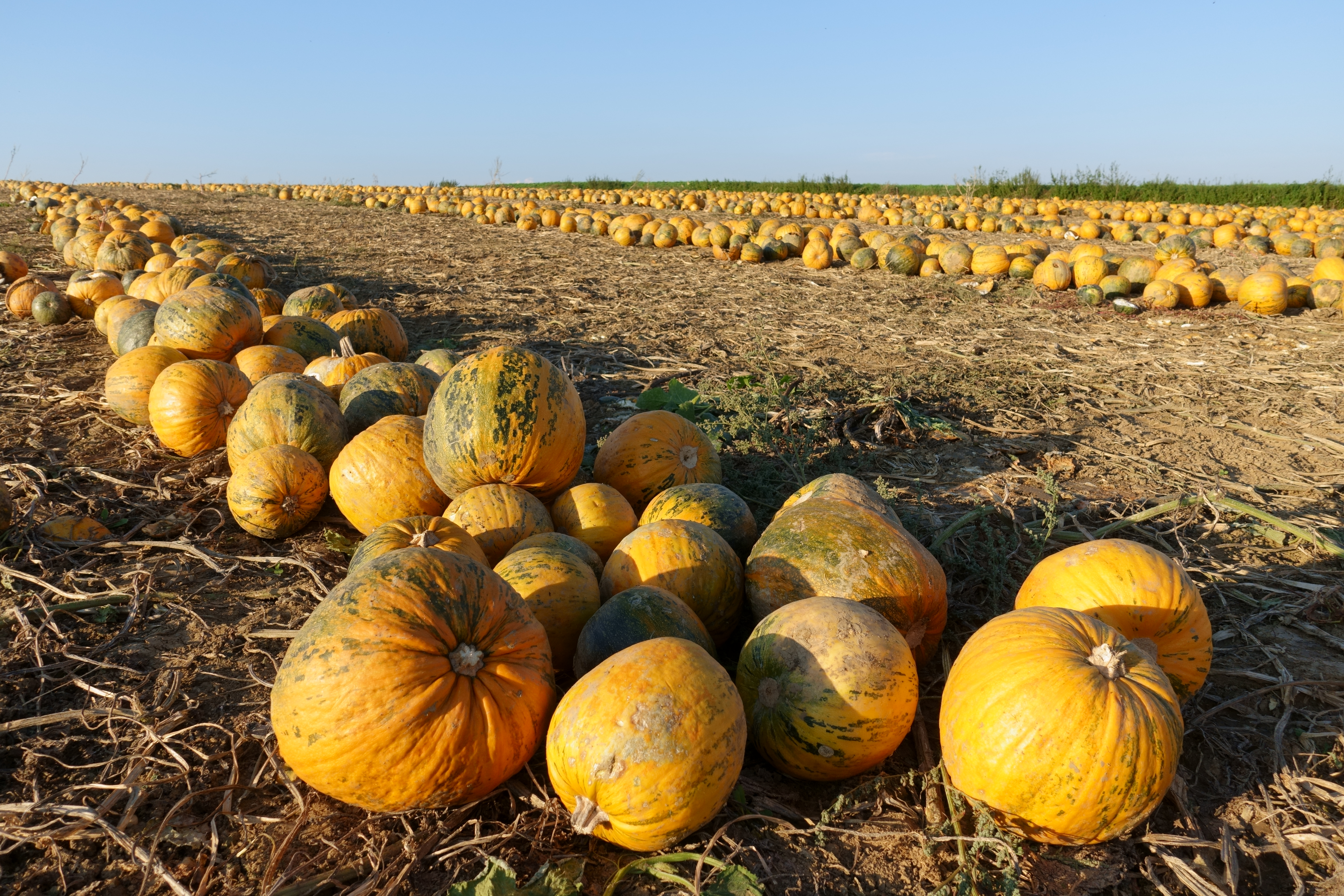
Field of Cucurbita pepo var. styriaca, Austria, ready for mechanical harvesting

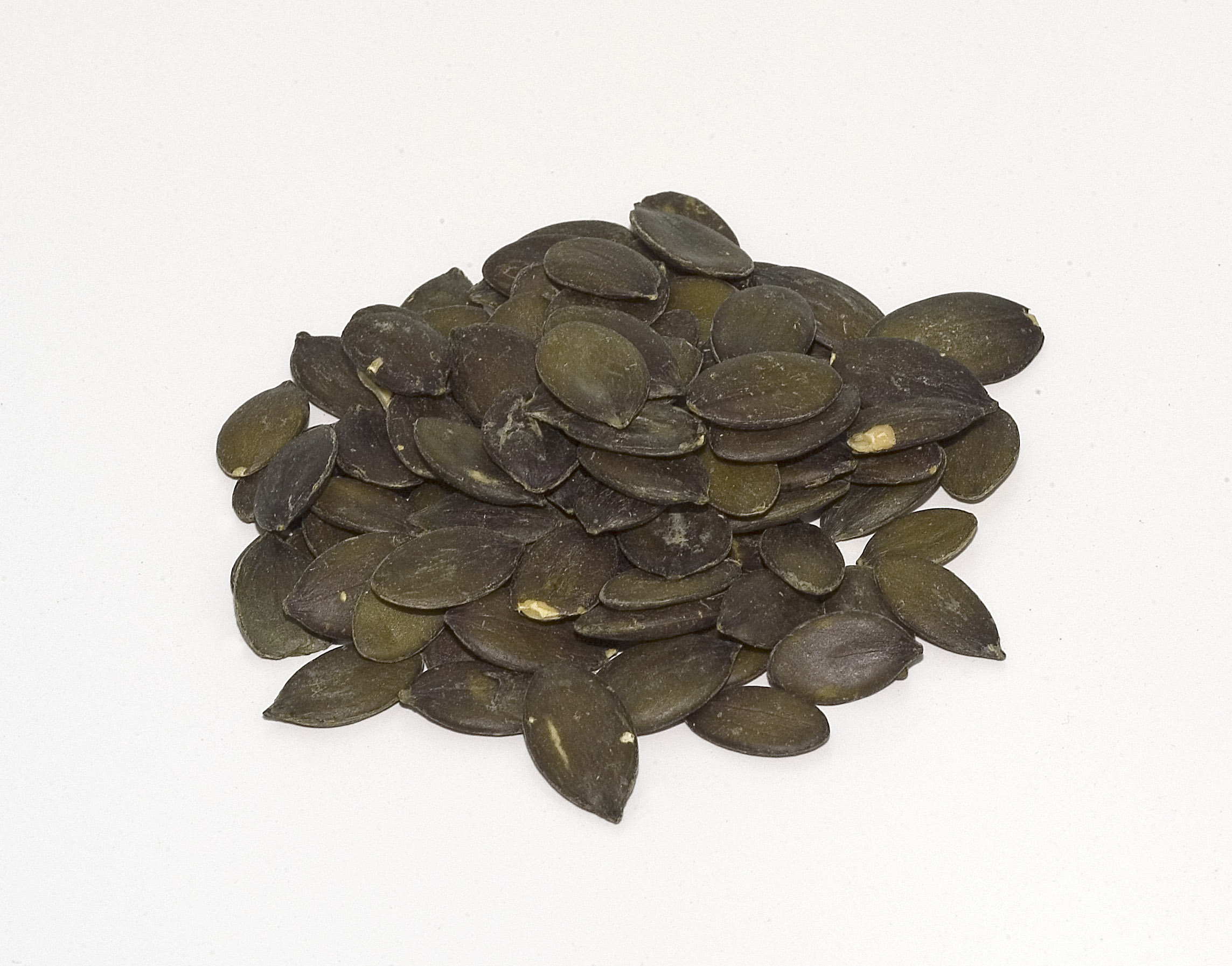
Dried seed of Cucurbita pepo var. styriaca

Pumpkin seed oil is a culinary oil, used especially in eastern Europe.

== Culinary uses ==
This oil is a culinary specialty from what used to be part of the Austro-Hungarian Empire and is now southeastern Austria (Styria), eastern Slovenia (Styria and Prekmurje), Central Transylvania, Orăștie-Cugir region of Romania, north western Croatia (esp. Međimurje), Vojvodina, and adjacent regions of Hungary. It is also used worldwide, including North America, Mexico, India and China.

Pumpkin seed oil has an intense nutty taste and is rich in polyunsaturated fatty acids. Browned oil has a bitter taste. Pumpkin seed oil serves as a salad dressing. The typical Styrian dressing consists of pumpkin seed oil and cider vinegar. The oil is also used for desserts, giving ordinary vanilla ice cream a nutty taste. It is considered a delicacy in Austria and Slovenia, and a few drops are added to pumpkin soup and other local dishes. Using it as a cooking oil, however, destroys its essential fatty acids.

== Production ==
Oil from pumpkin seeds is extracted by solvent extraction or by supercritical carbon dioxide methods. Once the oil is obtained, further specific extractions may be done, such as for carotenoids.

Styrian oil – an export commodity of Austria and Slovenia – is made by pressing roasted, hull-less pumpkin seeds from a local variety of pumpkin, the Styrian oil pumpkin (Cucurbita pepo subsp. pepo var. 'styriaca', also known as var. oleifera). High-temperature roasting improves the aromatic quality of pumpkin seed oil.

== Seed types and oil ==
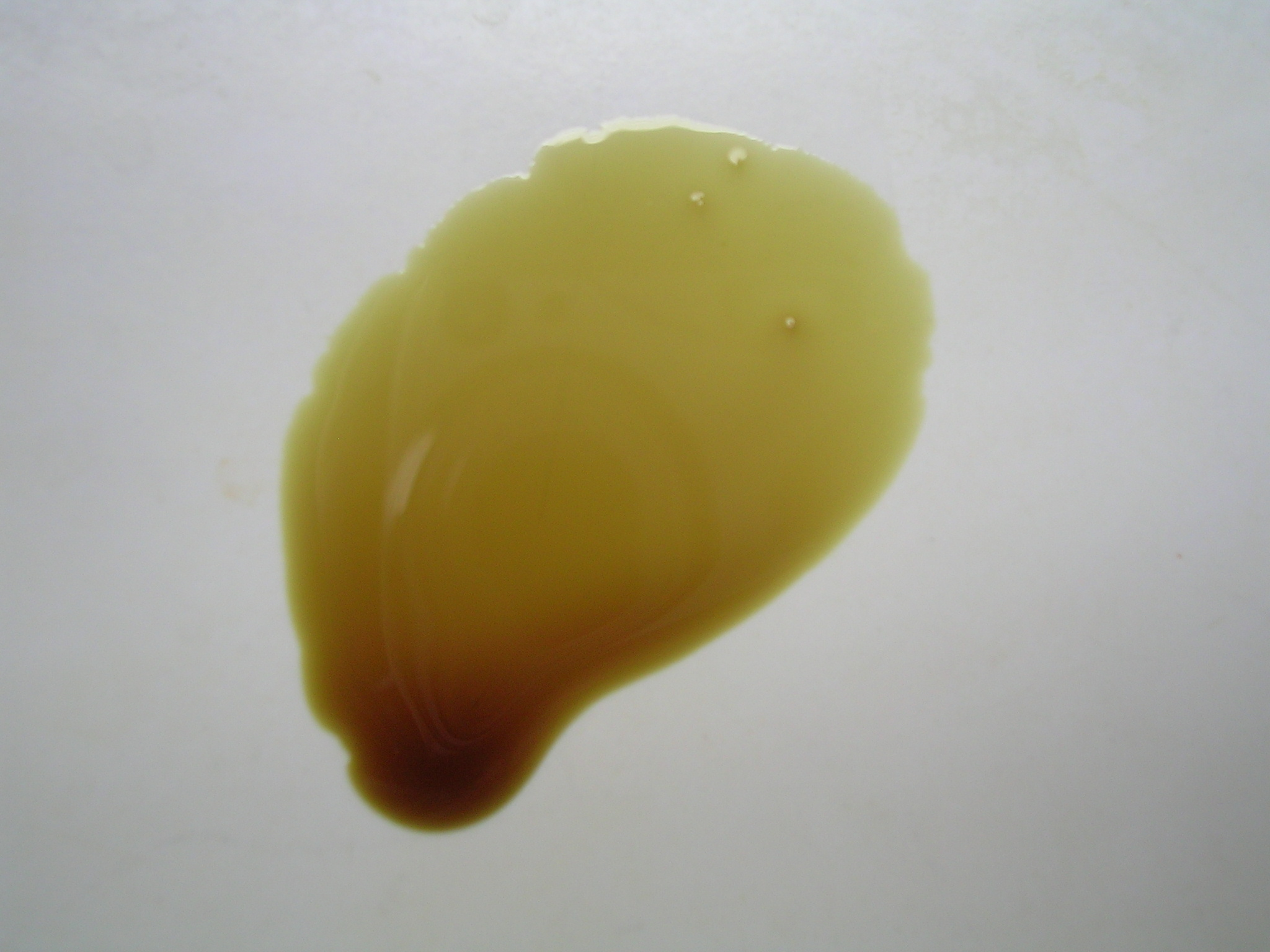
A drop on a white plate showing dichromatism

The viscous oil is light to very dark green to dark red in colour depending on the thickness of the observed sample. The oil appears green in thin layers and red in thick layers, an optical phenomenon called dichromatism. Pumpkin seed oil is one of the substances with the strongest dichromatism. Its Kreft's dichromaticity index is −44. When used together with yoghurt, the oil turns bright green and is sometimes referred to as "green-gold".

Other types of pumpkin seed oil are also marketed worldwide. International producers use white seeds with shells and this produces a cheaper white oil. New producers of seeds are located in China.

An analysis of the oil extracted from the seeds of each of twelve cultivars of C. maxima, related, yet different pumpkin species, yielded the following ranges for the percentage of several fatty acids:

n:unsat	Fatty acid name	Percentage range
(14:0)	Myristic acid	0.09–0.27
(16:0)	Palmitic acid	12.6–18.4
(16:1)	Palmitoleic acid	0.12–0.52
(18:0)	Stearic acid	5.1–8.5
(18:1)	Oleic acid	17.0–39.5
(18:2)	Linoleic acid	36.2–62.8
(18:3)	Linolenic acid	0.34–0.82
(20:0)	Arachidic acid	0.26–1.12
(20:1)	Gadoleic acid	0–0.17
(22:0)	Behenic acid	0.12–0.58

The sum of myristic and palmitic acid content ranged from 12.8 to 18.7%. The total unsaturated acid content ranged from 73.1 to 80.5%. The very long chain fatty acid (> 18 carbon atoms) content ranged from 0.44 to 1.37%.

The oil is localised in the small lipid droplets in the cotyledon cells.

== See also ==
- List of squash and pumpkin dishes
