= Dichromism =

Dichromism may refer to:

- Dichromacy, colour blindness
- Dichromatism, the phenomenon where the hue of the colour is dependent on the thickness of the medium
- Dichroism, a phenomenon where the material is splitting two or more beams of different colours (wavelengths)
- Sexual dimorphism, or sexual dichromism
