= Carmenta surinamensis =

Scientific classification
- Kingdom: Animalia
- Phylum: Arthropoda
- Clade: Pancrustacea
- Class: Insecta
- Order: Lepidoptera
- Family: Sesiidae
- Genus: Carmenta
- Species: C. surinamensis

Binomial name
- Carmenta surinamensis (Möschler, 1878)

Synonyms
- Sesia surinamensis Möschler, 1878; Aegeria corporalis Meyrick, 1930

Species of moth

Carmenta surinamensis is a moth of the family Sesiidae. It was described by Heinrich Benno Möschler in 1878, and is known from Brazil, Suriname, Guyana, Trinidad, Panama and Costa Rica. The larvae of the species have been found on seeds of the plant Prioria copaifera, Pentaclethra macroloba, and plants in the genus Mora.
