= Silver behenate =

Names
- IUPAC name Silver(I) docosanoate
- Other names Silver docosanoate; Behenic acid silver salt

Identifiers
CAS Number	2489-05-6
3D model (JSmol)	Interactive image
ChemSpider	144632
ECHA InfoCard	100.017.857
PubChem CID	164971
UNII	N3HP26F3PB
CompTox Dashboard (EPA)	DTXSID6062460
- InChI: InChI=1S/C22H44O2.Ag/c1-2-3-4-5-6-7-8-9-10-11-12-13-14-15-16-17-18-19-20-21-22(23)24;/h2-21H2,1H3,(H,23,24);/q;+1/p-1 Key: AQRYNYUOKMNDDV-UHFFFAOYSA-M
- SMILES: [Ag+].[O-]C(=O)CCCCCCCCCCCCCCCCCCCCC

Properties
Chemical formula	AgC_{22}H_{43}O_{2}
Molar mass	447.2287 g/mol
- Except where otherwise noted, data are given for materials in their standard state (at 25 °C [77 °F], 100 kPa). verify (what is ?) Infobox references

Silver behenate is a silver salt of the long-chain fatty acid behenic acid. It is a possible low-angle diffraction standard that was characterized using the powder diffraction technique.

== Description ==
With the National Institute of Standards and Technology's standard reference material silicon as an internal standard, the long spacing of silver behenate was accurately determined from the profile-fitted synchrotron diffraction peaks, with d_{001} = 58.380 (3) Å (5.8380(3) nm). This result was in agreement with that obtained from the CuKα pattern. The profile widths of the silver behenate peaks were found to be consistently larger than those of the silicon peaks, indicating significant line broadening for silver behenate. The average crystallite size along the long-spacing direction of silver behenate was estimated using the Scherrer equation, giving D(avg) = 900 (50) Å (85–95 nm).

Diffraction patterns obtained with 1.54 Å synchrotron and CuKα radiation showed thirteen reflections in the 2θ range from 1.5° to 20.0°, which suggests that the compound is suitable for use as an angle-calibration standard for low-angle diffraction. However, care must be taken if silver behenate is to be used as a peak-profile calibration standard because of line broadening.
