= Kreft's dichromaticity index =

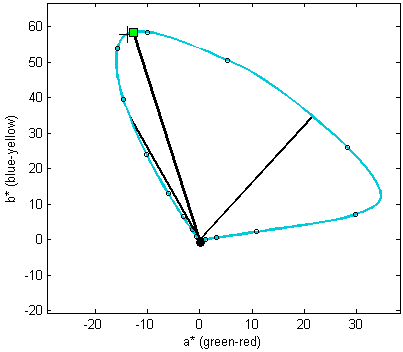
Presentation of the changing color of pumpkin oil (in the CIELab color space) as its thickness or concentration changes

Kreft's dichromaticity index (DI) is a measure for quantification of dichromatism. It is defined as the difference in hue angle (Δh_{ab}) between the color of the sample at the dilution, where the chroma (color saturation) is maximal, and the color of four times more diluted (or thinner) and four times more concentrated (or thicker) sample. The two hue angle differences are called the dichromaticity index towards lighter (Kreft's DI_{L}) and dichromaticity index towards darker (Kreft's DI_{D}) respectively. Kreft's dichromaticity indexes DI_{L} and DI_{D} for pumpkin seed oil, which is one of the most dichromatic substances, are −9 and −44, respectively. This means, that pumpkin seed oil changes its color from green-yellow to orange-red (for 44 degrees in Lab color space) when the thickness of the observed layer is increased from cca 0.5 mm to 2 mm; and it changes slightly towards green (for 9 degrees) if its thickness is reduced for four-fold.

The color of pumpkin oil at increasing thickness or concentration presented in CIELAB colorspace diagram. Straight lines are vectors showing hue (angle) and chroma (length) of the color at maximal chroma (toward the square mark), and the colors of four-fold less or more diluted or thick pumpkin oil (DI_{L} and DI_{D}). Note that DI_{D} is −44.1 degrees and DI_{L} corresponds to −8.97 degrees.

Dichromaticity (DI_{L} and DI_{D}) of selected substances, calculated from their VIS absorption spectra by the computer algorithm “Dichromaticity index calculator”:

Substance	DI_{L}	DI_{D}	Maximal chroma	Angle at maximal chroma
1,1-diethyl-2,2-cyanine iodide	4.3	−1.1	107.1	44.6
acridine orange	−10.1	−17.9	118.4	88.3
acridine yellow	−2.1	−1.7	123.1	98.6
auramine O	−3.4	0.4	130.1	94.7
beta carotene	−5.7	−7.0	131.8	91.5
bilirubin	−4.7	−6.0	136.5	90.3
bromophenol blue at pH 3.0	−12.4	−31.1	107.6	86.6
bromophenol blue at pH 3.2	−14.6	−42.4	92.9	86.5
bromophenol blue at pH 3.4	−48.9	−14.1	74.5	37.8
bromophenol blue at pH 3.6	−51.4	−16.4	70.6	37.4
bromophenol blue at pH 3.8	−49.8	−18.3	65.5	34.3
bromophenol blue at pH 4.0	−26.5	−10.8	68.9	31.4
bromophenol blue in water	−13.0	−34.7	104.7	86.4
C3 indocyanine	8.2	17.3	89.3	348.0
chlorophyll a in ether	29.2	60.7	50.4	201.4
chlorophyll b	11.2	27.3	44.5	143.2
coumarin 6	−2.0	−0.3	131.2	96.5
coumarin 343	−1.9	0.0	120.9	99.6
cryptocyanine	37.9	1.9	84.3	301.3
crystal violet in glycerol	9.7	3.3	141.3	318.3
crystal violet in water	9.3	3.7	142.0	319.1
fluorescein dibase	−1.6	−6.9	120.4	75.4
hemoglobin - oxy	−1.2	−5.6	108.4	42.6
hemoglobin	−2.3	−5.9	62.3	19.0
malachite green	7.3	24.4	61.2	223.2
nile blue in methanol	34.9	7.8	78.3	288.9
nile red	18.5	−9.5	103.2	45.9
proflavin at pH 7	−6.1	−10.6	101.6	98.5
pumpkin seed oil	−9.0	−44.1	59.8	102.2
resazurin	33.2	40.6	36.2	331.3
rhodamine 6G	21.9	−0.8	110.5	54.4
vitamin B_{12}	34.8	−6.2	102.0	39.8

Maximal chroma: chroma at concentration (thickness) where the color of the substance has maximal chroma (saturation). Angle at maximal chroma: the hue, which is represented by the angle of the vector to the color with maximal chroma in the CIELAB colorspace diagram.
