= Glyceryl behenate =

Names
- Other names Glycerol behenate; Glycerin behenate; Glycerol docosanoate

Identifiers
CAS Number	77538-19-3; 1-mono: 30233-64-8; 1,2-di: 99880-64-5; 1,3-di: 94201-62-4; tri: 18641-57-1
3D model (JSmol)	1-mono: Interactive image; 1,3-di: Interactive image; tri: Interactive image
ChEBI	1-mono: CHEBI:142497
ChEMBL	tri: ChEMBL2104418
ChemSpider	1-mono: 4515097; 1,2-di: 7822873; 1,3-di: 7986372; tri: 56470
ECHA InfoCard	100.071.540
EC Number	278-717-5; 1-mono: 250-097-0; 1,3-di: 303-650-6; tri: 242-471-7
PubChem CID	1-mono: 5362585; 1,3-di: 9810617; tri: 62726
UNII	R8WTH25YS2; 1-mono: A626UU0W2A; 1,2-di: 21E45121YS; 1,3-di: 84T2X52XS0; tri: 8OC9U7TQZ0
- InChI: 1-mono: InChI=1S/C25H50O4/c1-2-3-4-5-6-7-8-9-10-11-12-13-14-15-16-17-18-19-20-21-25(28)29-23-24(27)22-26/h24,26-27H,2-23H2,1H3 Key: OKMWKBLSFKFYGZ-UHFFFAOYSA-N; 1,3-di: InChI=1S/C47H92O5/c1-3-5-7-9-11-13-15-17-19-21-23-25-27-29-31-33-35-37-39-41-46(49)51-43-45(48)44-52-47(50)42-40-38-36-34-32-30-28-26-24-22-20-18-16-14-12-10-8-6-4-2/h45,48H,3-44H2,1-2H3 Key: GYNODFLZPXTEPN-UHFFFAOYSA-N; tri: InChI=1S/C69H134O6/c1-4-7-10-13-16-19-22-25-28-31-34-37-40-43-46-49-52-55-58-61-67(70)73-64-66(75-69(72)63-60-57-54-51-48-45-42-39-36-33-30-27-24-21-18-15-12-9-6-3)65-74-68(71)62-59-56-53-50-47-44-41-38-35-32-29-26-23-20-17-14-11-8-5-2/h66H,4-65H2,1-3H3 Key: DMBUODUULYCPAK-UHFFFAOYSA-N
- SMILES: 1-mono: CCCCCCCCCCCCCCCCCCCCCC(=O)OCC(CO)O; 1,3-di: CCCCCCCCCCCCCCCCCCCCCC(=O)OCC(COC(=O)CCCCCCCCCCCCCCCCCCCCC)O; tri: CCCCCCCCCCCCCCCCCCCCCC(=O)OCC(COC(=O)CCCCCCCCCCCCCCCCCCCCC)OC(=O)CCCCCCCCCCCCCCCCCCCCC

Properties
Chemical formula	Variable
Molar mass	Variable
- Except where otherwise noted, data are given for materials in their standard state (at 25 °C [77 °F], 100 kPa). verify (what is ?) Infobox references

Glyceryl behenate is a fat used in cosmetics, foods, and oral pharmaceutical formulations. In cosmetics, it is mainly used as a viscosity-increasing agent in emulsions.

In pharmaceutical formulations, glyceryl behenate is mainly used as a tablet and capsule lubricant and as a lipidic coating excipient. It has been investigated for the encapsulation of various drugs such as retinoids. It has also been investigated for use in the preparation of sustained release tablets as a matrix-forming agent for the controlled release of water-soluble drugs and as a lubricant in oral solid dosage formulations. It can also be used as a hot-melt coating agent sprayed onto a powder.

It is used widely in cosmetics as non-comedogenic (non- pimple causing substance) ingredient. It does not clog the oil pores of facial skin.

It is also used widely as ingredient for preparation of lipidic nano-particles such as solid lipid nanoparticles (SLN) and nanostructured lipid carriers (NLC). Chemically, glyceryl behenate is a mixture of various esters of behenic acid and glycerol (glycerides). The mixture predominantly contains the diester glyceryl dibehenate.

== See also ==
- Behenic acid
