= Silver stearate =

Names
- Other names silver octadecanoate

Identifiers
CAS Number	3507-99-1
3D model (JSmol)	Interactive image
ChemSpider	141200
ECHA InfoCard	100.020.460
EC Number	222-505-7
PubChem CID	160695
UNII	4H6PCL92ZN
CompTox Dashboard (EPA)	DTXSID10883982
- InChI: InChI=1S/C18H36O2.Ag/c1-2-3-4-5-6-7-8-9-10-11-12-13-14-15-16-17-18(19)20;/h2-17H2,1H3,(H,19,20);/q;+1/p-1 Key: ORYURPRSXLUCSS-UHFFFAOYSA-M
- SMILES: CCCCCCCCCCCCCCCCCC(=O)[O-].[Ag+]

Properties
Chemical formula	C_{18}H_{36}AgO_{2}
Molar mass	392.352 g·mol^{−1}
Appearance	white powder
Boiling point	359.4 °C (678.9 °F; 632.5 K)
Solubility in water	insoluble

Structure
Crystal structure	triclinic
Space group	P1
Point group	C_{1}
Lattice constant	a = 5.431 Å, b = 48.71 Å, c = 4.120 Å α = 90.53°, β = 122.80°, γ = 90.12°
Formula units (Z)	2

Hazards
- GHS labelling
Signal word	Warning
Hazard statements	H302, H312, H315, H319, H332, H335
Flash point	162.4 °C (324.3 °F; 435.5 K)
- Except where otherwise noted, data are given for materials in their standard state (at 25 °C [77 °F], 100 kPa). Infobox references

Silver stearate is a metal-organic compound with the chemical formula C_{18}H_{36}AgO_{2}. The compound is classified as a metallic soap, i.e. a metal derivative of a fatty acid (stearic acid).

== Synthesis ==
Silver stearate can be obtained by the reaction of sodium stearate and silver nitrate, and by the reaction of stearic acid and silver nitrate in presence of DBU.
