= Styrian oil pumpkin =

Cultivar of pumpkin

Cucurbita pepo var styriaca 'Styrian oil pumpkin'
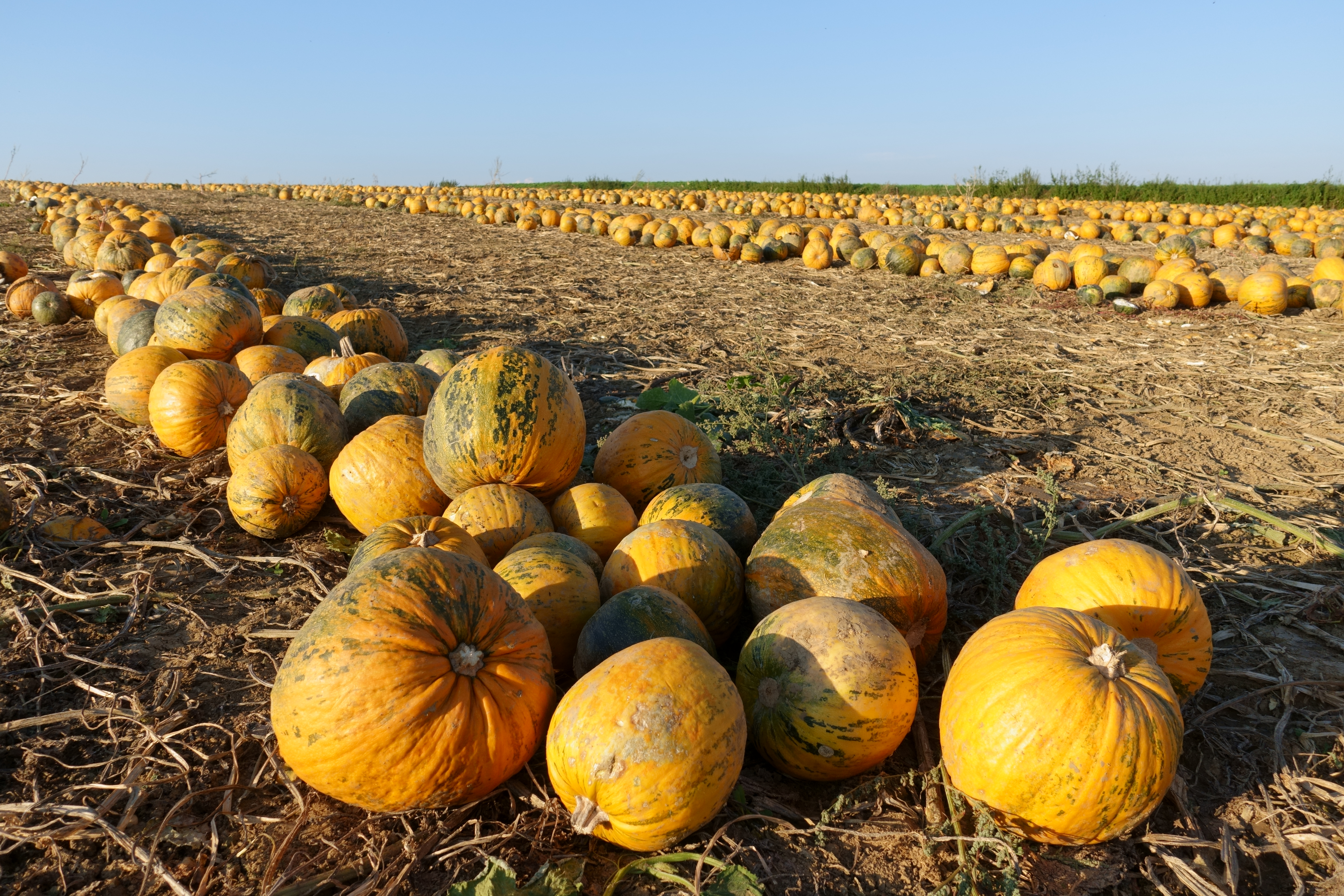
- Field with Styrian oil pumpkin
- Genus: Cucurbita
- Species: Cucurbita pepo
- Cultivar: Styrian oil

The Styrian oil pumpkin (Cucurbita pepo var. styriaca), also known as the Styrian pumpkin, is a variety of the common pumpkin (Cucurbita pepo pepo) which is cultivated to produce pumpkin seed oil.

The young fruits are dark green, turning yellow-orange upon ripening. They have a mutation resulting in the loss of the lignified seed shell. Approximately 2.5 kg of seed, the equivalent or 30–40 pumpkins, produce 1 liter of pumpkin seed oil. On average, a ripe oil pumpkin weighs between 8 and 10 kilograms.

== History ==
The Styrian oil pumpkin is of relatively recent origin. Its crucial mutation, resulting in distinctive dark green seeds, was first recorded between 1870 and 1880. This accidental natural mutation is the result of an alteration in a single recessive gene. The soft seed coat made efficient oil extraction possible and enabled the production of the renowned Styrian pumpkin seed oil, a regional specialty in southeastern Europe. The oil's history is closely tied to the economic and cultural dynamics of the area. Today, adulteration of Styrian pumpkin seed oil is considered professional fraud. Cheaper edible oils, such as sunflower oil, rapeseed oil, or soybean oil, are common adulterants.

== Distribution ==
It is traditionally cultivated industrially in parts of the former Austro-Hungarian Empire, in present-day south-eastern Austria (Styria), north-eastern Slovenia (Styria, Prekmurje), central Transylvania and the Orăștie-Cugir region of Romania, north-eastern Croatia (Međimurje), Vojvodina and neighbouring parts of Hungary. In these countries, the use of pumpkin seed oil in the diet is traditional. The Styrian oil pumpkin is also widespread in the far eastern part of Europe (Ukraine) and in Russia, North America, Mexico, India and China.

== Nutritional value ==
The oil's fatty acid profile, with polyunsaturated fatty acids constituting approximately 45.6 ± 5%rel, surpasses monounsaturated (35.9 ± 10%rel) and saturated fatty acids (18.5 ± 20%rel). Linoleic acid, oleic acid, palmitic acid, and stearic acid dominate, collectively accounting for nearly 98% of the fatty acids present. Minimal traces of other fatty acids are also present.

High-quality pumpkin seed oil has γ-tocopherol with concentrations reaching 800 mg/kg. This oil's γ-tocopherol levels are higher than its α-tocopherol levels. The oil also contains vitamin A, carotenoids such as lutein and β-carotene, and several vitamin B compounds. Styrian pumpkin seed oil exhibits elevated levels of sodium, potassium, magnesium, calcium, and phosphorus, with selenium being detected.

The oil contains phytosterols, approximately 2–2.5 times more concentrated than in the seeds, with D7-sterols being predominant. Styrian pumpkin seed oil owes its dark green color and distinct aroma to compounds like protochlorophyll, protopheophytin, and carotenoids. The aroma, characterized by a nutty roast, results from a roasting process involving high temperatures of extended duration. The oil also exhibits antioxidant properties attributed to its phenolic compounds, which constitute up to 40% of the total antioxidant capacity.

Although Styrian pumpkin seed oil contains significant amounts of antioxidants, the green pigments in the oil act make it light sensitive and shorten its shelf life. They are efficient sensitizers for light-induced fatty acid oxidation and, along with a high content of polyunsaturated fatty acids, make it susceptible to rancidity.

== Cultivation, production and storage ==
=== Sowing ===
Styrian oil pumpkins are sown at appropriate soil temperature between mid- and late April. It is sown into a seedbed of sandy, well-drained soil at a depth of 3–4 cm with a row distance of 80 cm. Heavy wet clay soils are not appropriate. A planting density of 17,000 seeds per hectare is appropriate. For organic farming 20,000 seeds per hectare should be sown for better competition against weeds.

=== Fertilisation ===
The styrian oil pumpkin requires 150 kg/ha of nitrogen, 13.1 kg/ha of phosphorus, 124.5 kg/ha of potassium and 10 kg/ha of magnesium.

=== Crop protection ===
A cultivator or appropriate chemicals can be used to combat weeds. There are no known fungicides with a significant effect in this culture. Insecticides can be significantly effective against aphids. The lack of a lignified seed shell makes it susceptible to soil-borne fungal diseases, increasing the risk of poor seed germination, especially in wet years. The pumpkin is also susceptible to fruit rot.

=== Harvest ===
The crop is harvested around September and October. It is ready when plant material is dead and the kernels are easily torn out of the fruit flesh. The pumpkins are harvested by first placing the plants into a swath. Then the pumpkins are picked and broken up. When opened, a harvester in the field removes the seeds using centrifugal force. The fruit flesh is discharged on the spot. Then the kernels can be transferred from the field.

=== Areas of cultivation and production ===
The climatic conditions in the areas of mid-Eastern Europe are suitable and, in particular, the average annual rainfall is often less than 800mm. World production of oil pumpkins is estimated at a total area of 600,000 hectares and a total yield of 200,000 tonnes of pumpkin seeds. Of this, approximately 120,000 tonnes of pumpkin seeds are produced in China. Huge quantities of these seeds also end up on the European market. World consumption of pumpkin seeds is as follows:

- 80% (160,000 tonnes) is used in the baking industry,
- 10% (20,000 tonnes) is processed into oil,
- 10% (20,000 tonnes) is used for other uses.
