= Dichromatic reflectance model =

In Shafer's dichromatic reflection model, scene radiance has two components:

$$L(\lambda) = m_\mathrm{b} c_\mathrm{b}(\lambda) + m_\mathrm{s}c_\mathrm{s}(\lambda)$$

λ is the wavelength,
c_{b} is the body (diffuse) reflected component,
c_{s} is the surface (interface) (specular) reflected component,
m_{b} and m_{s} are scale factors depending on illumination, view directions and surface orientation.

== Separation algorithm ==
=== BREN (body reflection essence-neuter) model based ===
Body essence is an entity invariant to interface reflection, and has two degrees of freedom. The Gaussian coefficient generalizes a conventional simple thresholding scheme, and it provides detailed use of body color similarity.
