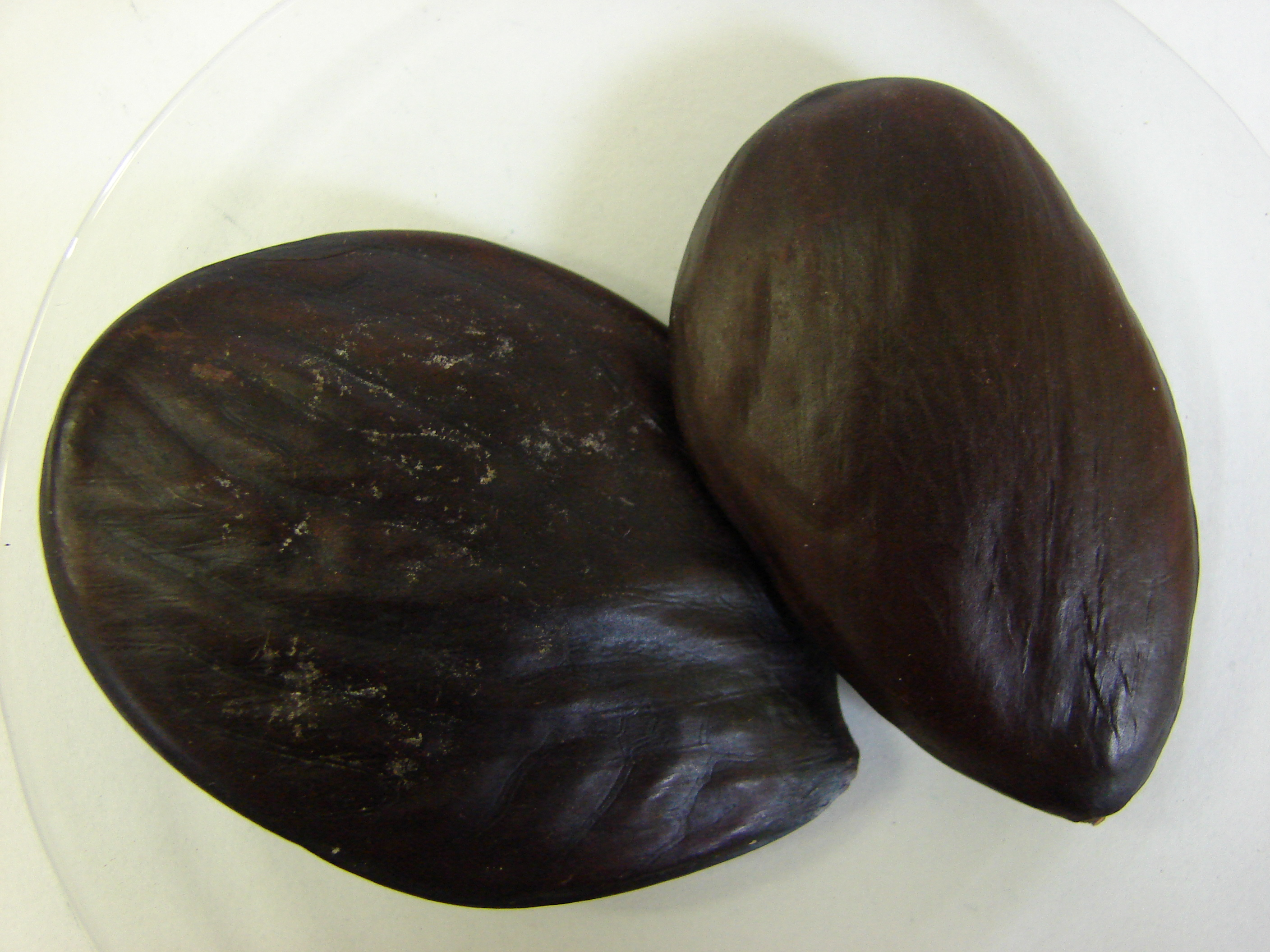
- Seed

Scientific classification
- Kingdom: Plantae
- Clade: Tracheophytes
- Clade: Angiosperms
- Clade: Eudicots
- Clade: Rosids
- Order: Fabales
- Family: Fabaceae
- Subfamily: Caesalpinioideae
- Clade: Mimosoid clade
- Genus: Pentaclethra
- Species: P. macrophylla

Binomial name
- Pentaclethra macrophylla Benth.

= Pentaclethra macrophylla =

Species of plant

Pentaclethra macrophylla, also known as the African oil bean, tree is a large size tree with long bipinnate compound leaves that is endemic to West and Central Africa. It is within the family Fabaceae. Seeds of the species are prepared and fermented to make Ugba, a soup condiment in Nigeria.

== Description ==
A large tree that is capable of growing up to 36 meters tall, mature trees are scaly, brown barked and low branching; the base of the tree has thick buttressed roots while the trunk is gnarled and twisted. Leaves, up to 45 cm long, alternate, bipinnately compound in arrangement, 9-13 pairs of opposite pinnae with 8-14 pairs of leaflets per pinnae, leaflets are rhombic in shape; stipule is 3–5 mm long and petiole can be up to 8 cm long. Leaflets are oblong to elliptical in outline, 1.2-2.5 cm long and 5–8 mm wide, apex is rounded to obtuse, leaf base is unequal, either auriculate or cuneate. Inflorescence, terminal or axial, up to 30 cm long in spiciform panicles; calyx tube is 0.7 mm long, calyx lobes are 5, up to 0.5 mm long, petals are also 5, up to 3 mm long. Flowers are fragrant and pale yellow in color, flowering period is between February and April. Fruit is a dark brown -blackish pod, up to 50 cm long, 10 cm wide and 2 cm in thickness, 6-10, seeded, the seeds that have a purplish brown testa, are 3.5–6 cm long and up to 1 cm thick.

== Distribution ==
Occurs in the forest zones of Senegal eastwards to Sudan and southwards to Angola.

== Uses ==
After processing and fermentation, the processed seeds containing carbohydrates that is rich in fructose and glucose, fatty oil that is rich in oleic and linoleic acid, protein and amino acids are used as condiments in soups and salad or eaten. Oil extracts from the seeds are used to make 'owala' butter, an ingredient used in making candles, lubricants and ointments in Central Africa.

A decoction of the bark is applied as a topical treatment for sores and wounds. In parts of Nigeria, leaf extracts are used in traditional medicine for the treatment of diarrhea related ailments.

== Alkaloids ==
Paucine (N-Caffeoylputrescine) [26148-06-1] is an alkaloid contained in Pentaclethra macrophylla Benth.
