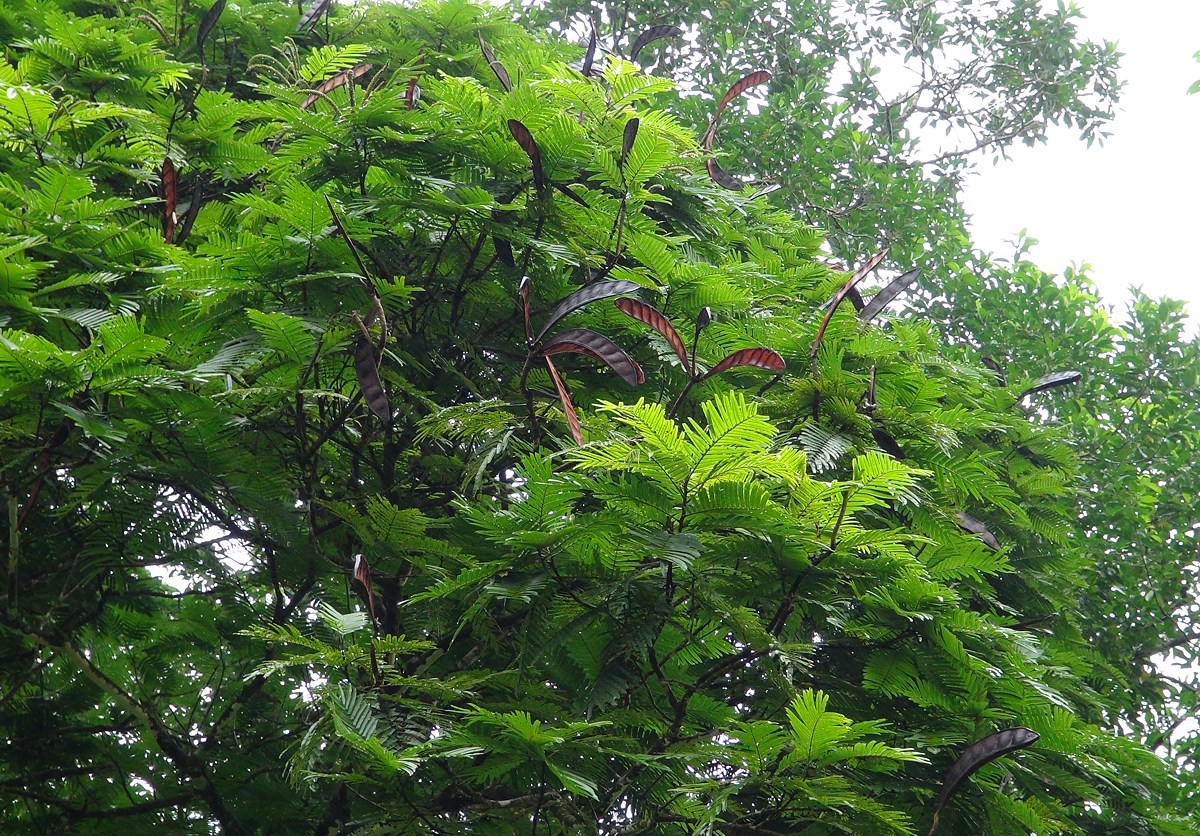
- Pentaclethra macroloba tree in Costa Rica

Scientific classification
- Kingdom: Plantae
- Clade: Tracheophytes
- Clade: Angiosperms
- Clade: Eudicots
- Clade: Rosids
- Order: Fabales
- Family: Fabaceae
- Subfamily: Caesalpinioideae
- Clade: Mimosoid clade
- Genus: Pentaclethra; Benth.

Species
- Pentaclethra eetveldeana Pentaclethra macroloba Pentaclethra macrophylla

= Pentaclethra =

Genus of legumes

Pentaclethra is a small genus of trees from the tropics. They are flowering plants in the family Fabaceae. They belong to the mimosoid clade of the subfamily Caesalpinioideae.

The name Pentaclethra is derived from Ancient Greek, penta meaning 'five', and cleithro meaning 'bolt', which alludes to the five imbricate sepals and five petals joined at the base, characteristic of this genus.

== Species ==
Pentaclethra is a small genus with three species. It is considered basal to the mimosoid clade. One species, P. macroloba, occurs in the American tropics. This is the dominant tree in certain seasonal swamp forests in coastal areas of Atlantic Panama. The other two species occur in Africa.

Pentaclethra, popularly known as ugba (raw oil bean seeds) in Africa, has great nutritional value. Proximate analysis of raw oil bean seed reveals that it is composed of proteins (36–42%), lipids (43–47%) and carbohydrates (4–17%). The high content of the essential amino acids makes the seed a potential source of protein. Glutamic acid appears to be the largest amino acid contained in the seed and its fermented product. This could explain why pentaclethra (ugba) is often used as a flavoring agent for soups in southeastern Nigeria.

- Pentaclethra eetveldeana De Wild. & T.Durand
- Pentaclethra macroloba (Willd.) Kuntze
- Pentaclethra macrophylla Benth.
