= Behenic acid =

21-Carbon fatty acid

Names
- Preferred IUPAC name Docosanoic acid
- Other names Behenic acid, Docosanoic acid; 1-Docosanoic acid; n-Docosanoic acid, n-Docosanoate, Glycon B-70, Hydrofol Acid 560, Hydrofol 2022-55, Hystrene 5522, Hystrene 9022, Prifrac 2989, C22:0 (Lipid numbers)

Identifiers
CAS Number	112-85-6
3D model (JSmol)	Interactive image
ChEBI	CHEBI:28941
ChEMBL	ChEMBL1173474
ChemSpider	7923
ECHA InfoCard	100.003.646
EC Number	204-010-8
KEGG	C08281
PubChem CID	8215
UNII	H390488X0A
CompTox Dashboard (EPA)	DTXSID3026930
- InChI: InChI=1S/C22H44O2/c1-2-3-4-5-6-7-8-9-10-11-12-13-14-15-16-17-18-19-20-21-22(23)24/h2-21H2,1H3,(H,23,24) Key: UKMSUNONTOPOIO-UHFFFAOYSA-N; InChI=1/C22H44O2/c1-2-3-4-5-6-7-8-9-10-11-12-13-14-15-16-17-18-19-20-21-22(23)24/h2-21H2,1H3,(H,23,24) Key: UKMSUNONTOPOIO-UHFFFAOYAN
- SMILES: O=C(O)CCCCCCCCCCCCCCCCCCCCC

Properties
Chemical formula	C_{22}H_{44}O_{2}
Molar mass	340.592 g·mol^{−1}
Appearance	White solid
Melting point	80.0 °C (176.0 °F; 353.1 K)
Boiling point	306 °C (583 °F; 579 K)

Hazards
NFPA 704 (fire diamond)	1 1 0
- Except where otherwise noted, data are given for materials in their standard state (at 25 °C [77 °F], 100 kPa). verify (what is ?) Infobox references

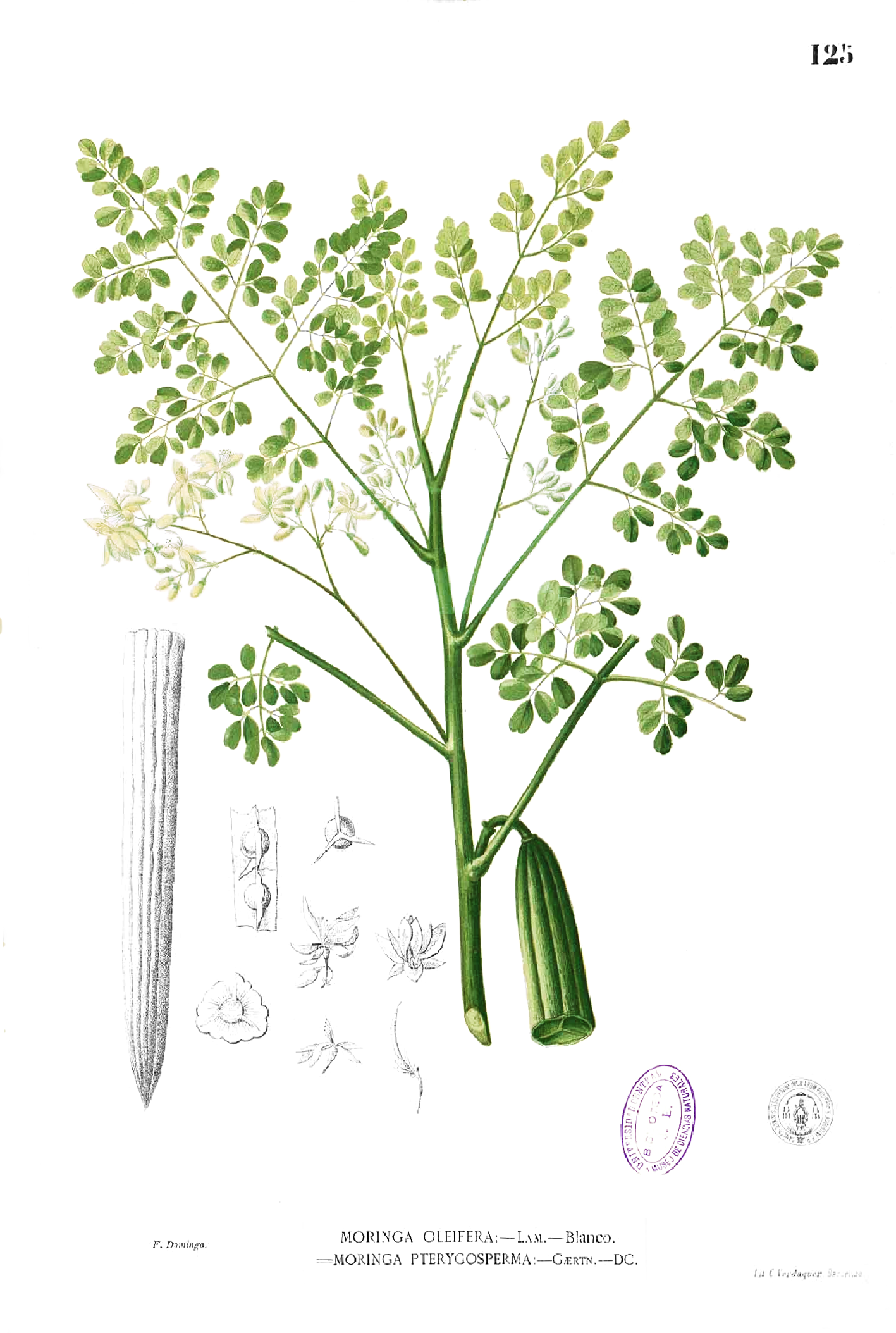
Behenic acid comes from the ben oil tree, Moringa oleifera

Behenic acid (also docosanoic acid) is a carboxylic acid, the saturated fatty acid with formula C_{21}H_{43}COOH. In appearance, it consists of white solid although impure samples appear yellowish.

== Sources ==
At 9%, it is a major component of ben oil (or behen oil), which is extracted from the seeds of the drumstick tree (Moringa oleifera). It is so named from the Persian month Bahman, when the roots of this tree were harvested.

Behenic acid is also present in some other oils and oil-bearing plants, including rapeseed (canola) and peanut oil and skins. It is estimated that one ton of peanut skins contains 13 pounds (5.9 kg) of behenic acid.

== Properties ==
As a dietary oil, behenic acid is poorly absorbed. In spite of its low bioavailability compared with oleic acid, behenic acid is a cholesterol-raising saturated fatty acid in humans.

== Uses ==
Commercially, behenic acid is often used to give hair conditioners and moisturizers their smoothing properties. It is also used in lubricating oils, and as a solvent evaporation retarder in paint removers. Its amide is used as an anti-foaming agent in detergents, floor polishes and dripless candles. Reduction of behenic acid yields behenyl alcohol.

Pracaxi oil (from the seeds of Pentaclethra macroloba) is a natural product with one of the highest concentrations of behenic acid, and is used in hair conditioners.

== See also ==
- Behenyl alcohol
- Glyceryl behenate
- Silver behenate
