= Cucurbitin =

Names
- Preferred IUPAC name (3R)-3-Aminopyrrolidine-3-carboxylic acid
- Other names (+)-Cucurbitin; Cucurbitine

Identifiers
CAS Number	6807-92-7
3D model (JSmol)	Interactive image
ChemSpider	390997
PubChem CID	442634
UNII	82AL4JJ8J2
CompTox Dashboard (EPA)	DTXSID20218286
- InChI: InChI=1S/C5H10N2O2/c6-5(4(8)9)1-2-7-3-5/h7H,1-3,6H2,(H,8,9)/t5-/m1/s1 Key: DWAKXSZUASEUHH-RXMQYKEDSA-N; InChI=1/C5H10N2O2/c6-5(4(8)9)1-2-7-3-5/h7H,1-3,6H2,(H,8,9)/t5-/m1/s1 Key: DWAKXSZUASEUHH-RXMQYKEDBI
- SMILES: O=C(O)[C@]1(N)CNCC1

Properties
Chemical formula	C_{5}H_{10}N_{2}O_{2}
Molar mass	130.147 g·mol^{−1}
- Except where otherwise noted, data are given for materials in their standard state (at 25 °C [77 °F], 100 kPa). Infobox references

Cucurbitin is an amino acid and apyrrolidinecarboxylate that is found in Cucurbita seeds. Cucurbitin causes degenerative changes in the reproductive organs of parasitic flatworms called flukes.
