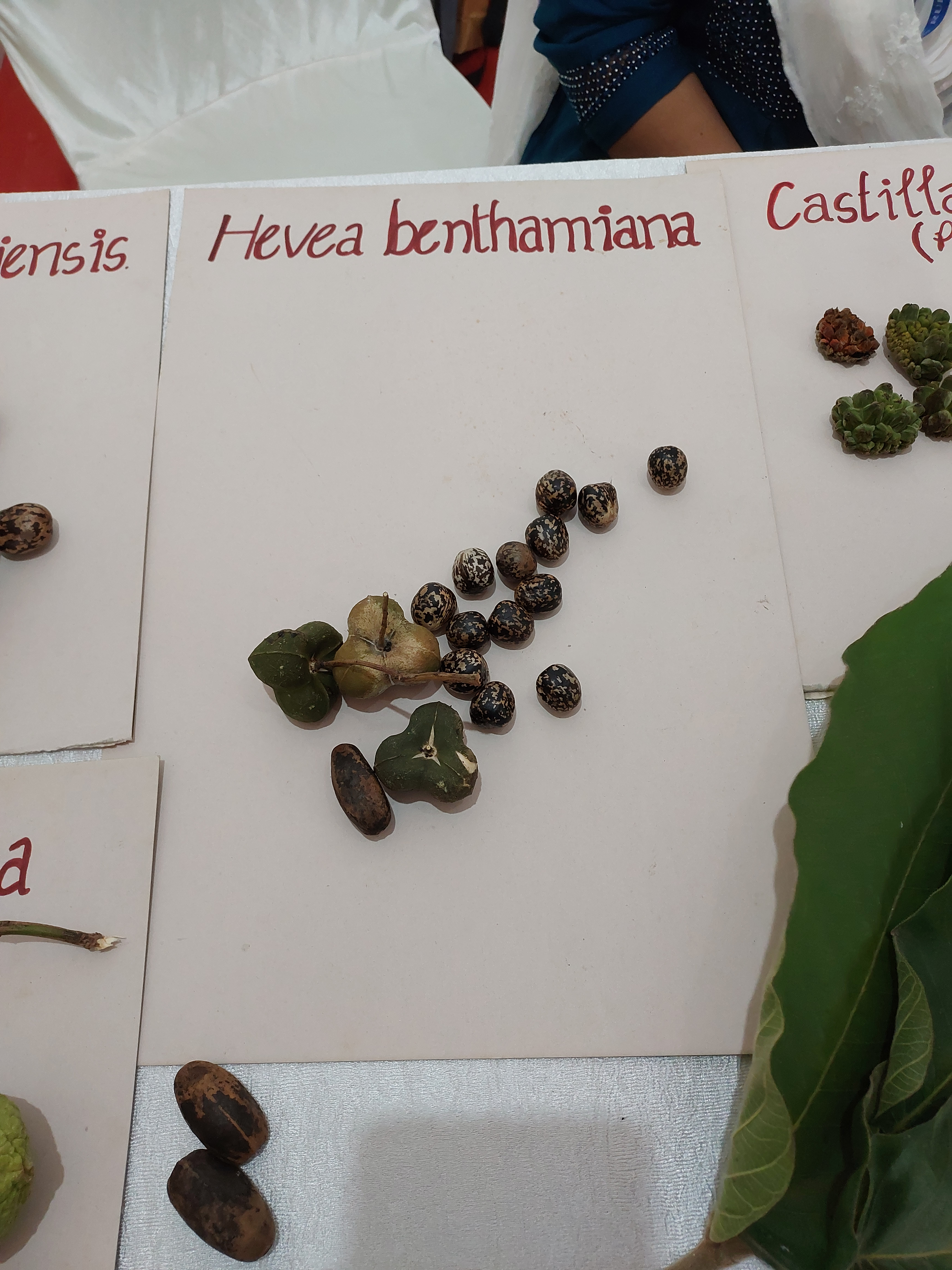
- Seeds

Scientific classification
- Kingdom: Plantae
- Clade: Tracheophytes
- Clade: Angiosperms
- Clade: Eudicots
- Clade: Rosids
- Order: Malpighiales
- Family: Euphorbiaceae
- Genus: Hevea
- Species: H. benthamiana

Binomial name
- Hevea benthamiana Müll.Arg.

= Hevea benthamiana =

Species of tree

Hevea benthamiana is a species of rubber tree in the genus Hevea, belonging to the family Euphorbiaceae. A medium-sized deciduous tree growing to a height of about 27 m (90 ft), it is native to the rainforests of northern Brazil, Colombia and Venezuela.

== Description ==
H. benthamiana is a medium-sized deciduous tree growing to around 27 m (90 ft), often with a narrow crown and a swollen, bottle-like trunk; these features seem to be a response to periodic flooding because they do not occur in cultivated trees. This tree is deciduous, shedding its old foliage before stubby "winter shoots" develop. This may be a response to the fungal leaf diseases that readily occur in the constantly humid environment. The leaves have three elliptical leaflets which have a golden-brown pubescence on the underside. The inflorescences have separate male and female flowers, the male flowers having seven to nine stamens in two irregular whorls. The seeds are rounded.

== Habitat ==
The species is native to northern Brazil, Colombia and Venezuela. Its range is entirely to the north of the Amazon River and covers large parts of the Rio Negro and Vaupés River system, the Rio Negro being the largest left-bank tributary of the Amazon. It grows in areas of rainforest that are frequently inundated, often in association with the fan palm Mauritia carana in bogs that are flooded all year round. Because of its different habitat needs, it does not extend as far west as H. guianensis, H. nitida or H. pauciflora.

== Uses ==
H. benthamiana produces a good quality latex which is slightly lower in quality than that of the Pará rubber tree, H. brasiliensis. The tree is tapped for the production of rubber but is not widely grown as a plantation crop, although occasionally cultivated in Venezuela, Sri Lanka, Malaysia, and Indonesia. It has been used in breeding programmes for increasing the disease resistance and improving the growth qualities of H. brasiliensis. The seeds contain toxic substances and are poisonous to humans when raw, but they are eaten by local people when thoroughly cooked.
