= Hevea microphylla =

Scientific classification
- Kingdom: Plantae
- Clade: Tracheophytes
- Clade: Angiosperms
- Clade: Eudicots
- Clade: Rosids
- Order: Malpighiales
- Family: Euphorbiaceae
- Genus: Hevea
- Species: H. microphylla

Binomial name
- Hevea microphylla Ule

Species of tree

Hevea microphylla is a species of rubber tree in the genus Hevea, belonging to the family Euphorbiaceae. It is native to the Amazon basin where it occurs in Venezuela, Colombia and northern Brazil. It was first described in 1905 by the German botanist Ernst Heinrich Georg Ule. It is the only member of the genus to be included in the subgenus Microphyllae.

== Description ==
H. microphylla is a small tree up to 18 m (60 ft) tall, with a small, sparse crown and a slender trunk with a swollen, bottle-like base. It bears "winter shoots", stubby side shoots with short internodes, scale leaves on the stem and larger leaves near the tip. These poorly-developed shoots are short-lived, the foliage being shed before new shoots develop; this species shares this feature with H. benthamiana and H. brasiliensis, the remaining trees in the genus being evergreen. The leaves have three leaflets which are bent back in the bud and are later held in a horizontal or deflexed position. The inflorescence develops in a leaf axle and consists of separate male and female flowers with five perianth lobes, with the female flowers near the panicle tip. These female flowers have a swollen torus at the base and are the largest in the genus. The fruit is a capsule with three large seeds, each measuring around 25 by 14 mm (1.0 by 0.6 in). It is yellow with green stripes and a red tip when ripe. In H. microphylla, in contrast to other members of the genus, this capsule has thin, leathery valves and does not burst open when ripe to expel the seeds.

== Distribution and habitat ==
H. microphylla is an uncommon species endemic to the upper and middle reaches of the Rio Negro, a left-bank tributary of the Amazon River. It mostly grows on river banks or islands and the sandy or laterite soils it favours are heavily inundated by flood water for at least four months each year.

== Uses ==
H. microphylla is not exploited in the wild, probably because of the poor quality of the latex which is mixed with resins, and it is not cultivated.
