= Rubber seed oil =

Oil extracted from the seeds of rubber trees

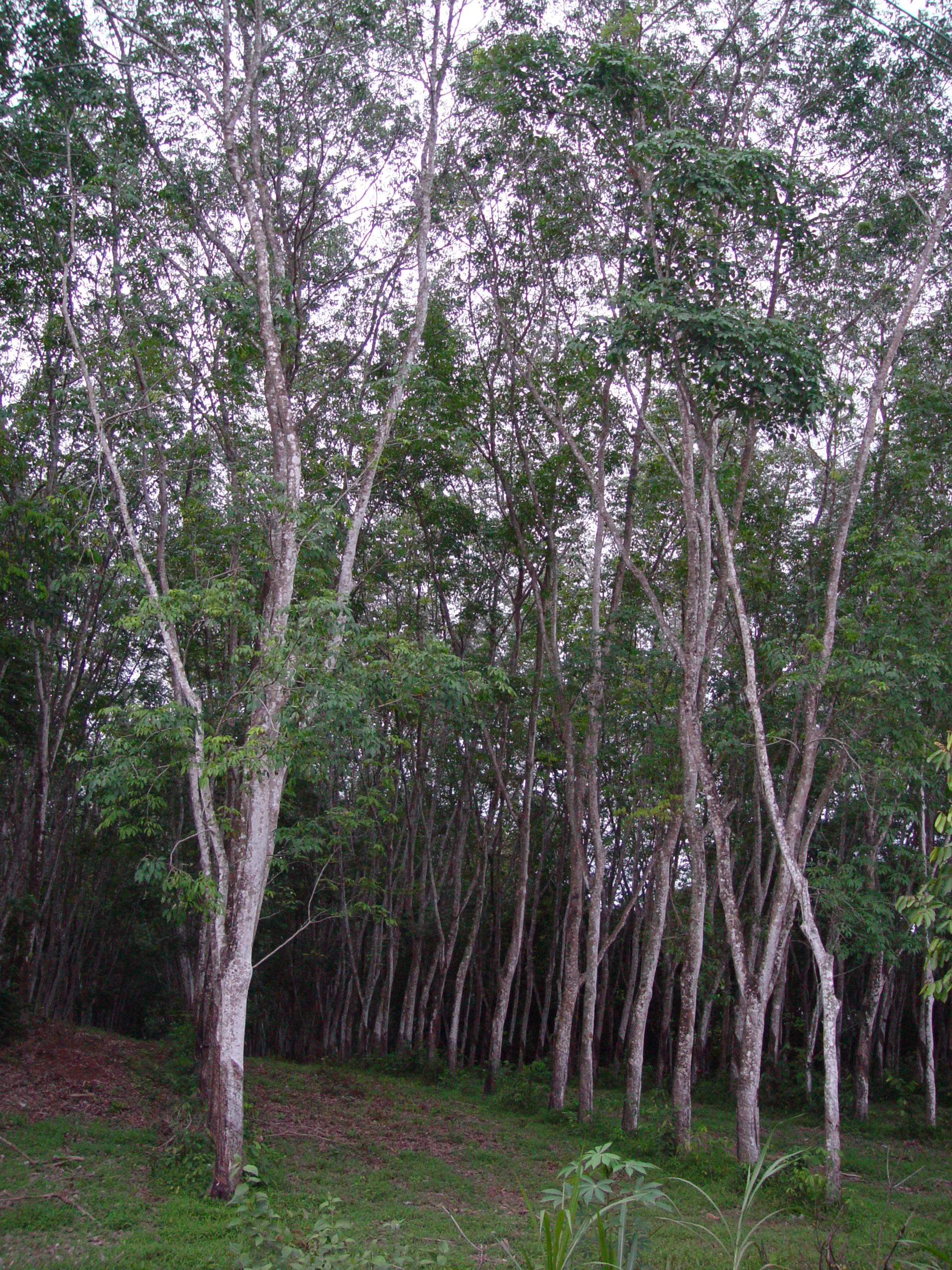
Rubber trees

Rubber seed oil is oil extracted from the seeds of rubber trees. In the latex manufacturing process, rubber seeds are not historically collected and commercialized. Recent analysis shows that rubber seed oil contained the following fatty acids:

- Palmitic (C16:0) - 0.2%
- Stearic (C18:0) - 8.7%
- Oleic (C18:1) - 24.6%
- Linoleic (C18:2) - 39.6%
- Linolenic (C18:3) - 16.3%

In India and other rubber manufacturing areas rubber seeds are used to feed livestock. In India in the Virudhunagar district a company Index International extracts oil from rubber seeds and uses the rubber seed cake for cattle feed.

Although rubber seed is rich in nutrients it also contains cyanogenic glycosides which will release prussic acid in the presence of enzymes or in slightly acidic conditions. Oil from the rubber seed could also be of commercial value. Hitherto, rubber seed has largely been allowed to waste with very little use for raising root stock seedlings for propagation purposes. The useful properties of the rubber seed oil make it similar to well-known linseed and soybean oil. Rubber seed oil also could be used for the paint industry as a semidrying oil, in the manufacture of soap, for the production of linoleum and alkyd resin; in medicine as antimalaria oil; and in engineering as core binder for factice preparation. The cake left after oil extraction is used in fertilizer preparation and as feed for cattle and poultry.

The potential of rubber wood as a source of timber is recognized in India, Sri Lanka, Indonesia, and Malaysia, with an increasing volume of sawn rubber wood used for furniture manufacturing and a variety of other applications.

== See also ==
- Biofuels
