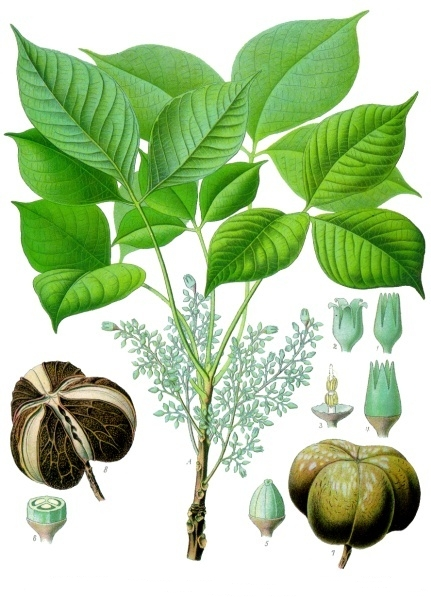
- Hevea brasiliensis

Scientific classification
- Kingdom: Plantae
- Clade: Embryophytes
- Clade: Tracheophytes
- Clade: Spermatophytes
- Clade: Angiosperms
- Clade: Eudicots
- Clade: Rosids
- Order: Malpighiales
- Family: Euphorbiaceae
- Subfamily: Crotonoideae
- Tribe: Micrandreae
- Subtribe: Heveinae
- Genus: Hevea; Aubl.
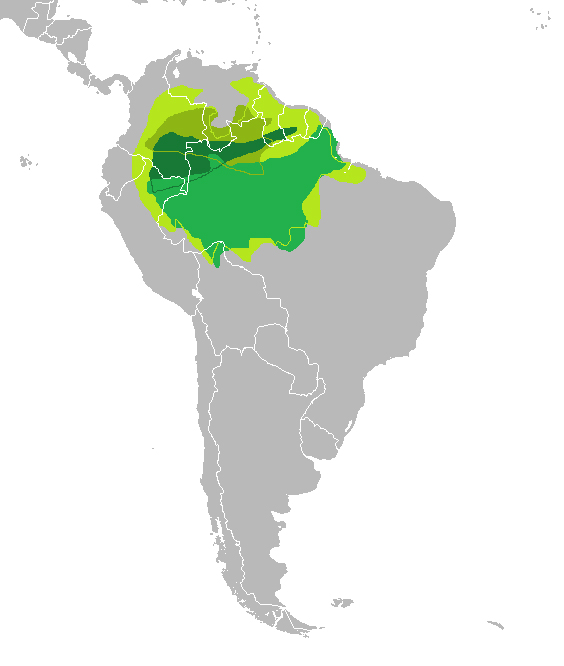
- Range of the genus Hevea.

Synonyms
- Caoutchoua J.F.Gmel.; Micrandra Benn. & R.Br. 1854, illegitimate homonym, not Benth. 1844; Siphonanthus Schreb. ex Baill.; Siphonia D.Richard ex Schreb. 1791 not Benth. 1841 (Rubiaceae)

= Hevea =

Genus of flowering plants

Hevea is a genus of flowering plants in the spurge family, Euphorbiaceae, with about ten members. It is also one of many names used commercially for the wood of the most economically important rubber tree, H. brasiliensis. The genus is native to tropical South America but is widely cultivated in other tropical countries and naturalized in several of them. It was first described in 1775.

== Characteristics ==
French botanist and explorer Jean Baptiste Christophore Fusée Aublet first described Hevea as a genus in 1775. H. brasiliensis and H. guianensis are large trees, often reaching more than 30 m (100 ft) in height. Most of the other members of the genus are small to medium trees, and H. camporum is a shrub of around 2 m (7 ft). Trees in this genus are either deciduous or evergreen. Certain species, namely H. benthamiana, H. brasiliensis and H. microphylla, bear "winter shoots", stubby side shoots with short internodes, scale leaves on the stem and larger leaves near the tip; on these, the leaves are shed leaving the tree bare before new shoots develop. The remaining species bear more vigorous side shoots which develop before the old foliage is shed and thus the tree remains green. The leaves consist of three, usually elliptical, leaflets which are held horizontally or slightly drooping in most species. The inflorescences have separate male and female flowers, with the females being at the end of the panicles. The fruits are capsules, usually with three seeds, which in all except two species (H. spruceana and H. microphylla) split explosively when ripe to eject the large seeds.

== Distribution ==
The genus occurs naturally in tropical South America, mostly in the Amazon basin. To the north of the basin, the land rises to the watershed of the Guiana Shield on the border between Brazil and Venezuela, and the southern foothills of these mountains form the northerly limit of the genus. It is also present in the upper reaches of the Orinoco River. The genus extends westwards as far as the foothills of the Andes and southwards to the foothills of the Mato Grosso. Its easterly limit is the Atlantic Ocean. The most widespread species is H. guianensis which occurs over the whole range of the genus.

The Pará rubber tree (H. brasiliensis) occurs mainly south of the Amazon, as does H. camporum, but the greatest diversity occurs to the north of the river, in the Rio Negro region, where all the other species occur. In this area where there are variations in soil and topography and the rainforest experiences conditions of all-year-round humidity, the genus Hevea has been undergoing a high degree of speciation. The high humidity encourages the growth of fungal leaf diseases, and the species that are deciduous avoid immediate transfer of fungal spores from old leaves onto new growth. The Pará rubber tree has been introduced to and is naturalised in many tropical countries in Asia.

== Habitat ==
Each species has its own habitat requirements; H. brasiliensis grows on well-drained soils but tolerates light flooding; H. guianensis, H. pauciflora and H. rigidifolia grow in well-drained soil, on high river banks and on slopes; and H. camporum grows on savannahs. Other species such as H. benthamiana, H. microphylla and H. spruceana need wetter conditions in locations subject to seasonal flooding for several months each year, and H. nitida grows both in periodically inundated swamps and in drier locations such as rocky hillsides well above the flood level.

== Rubber History ==
Rubber from Hevea trees comes from the sap that the trees produce to prevent the boring of insects.

=== Historical Uses ===
Indigenous groups in Mesoamerica collected the sap through tapping. They formed rubber bouncing balls for games and also used dried sap to waterproof their clothing.

=== European Discovery ===
The initial discovery is believed to be by Christopher Columbus in the 15th-16th century, through accounts of him returning with a rubber ball. The curiosity came from the soft, sticky texture when warm and hard, brittle texture when cold. There was no commercial development until the 19th century, beyond small-scale waterproofing and erasers.

=== Pneumatic tires ===
In 1839, Charles Goodyear accidentally spilled a combination of rubber and sulfur on a hot stove. Through vulcanization the rubber maintained its elasticity when cold and was no longer sticky while hot. From this discovery, in 1887 pneumatic tires were created for both bicycles and cars, leading to an increase in rubber demand.

=== Botanical Piracy ===
With the development of the pneumatic tire industry, trees were being tapped at too fast a rate to maintain. In response, Brazil banned the trading of Hevea trees and seeds to protect its primary export. However, in 1876 Henry Wickham, a British envoy from Kew Gardens, stole over 70,000 seeds which were shipped across the world. Only 12 seeds germinated and survived in Asia, where China and India were able to develop hevea plantations and dominate the rubber industry.

== Species ==
The following species are recognised:

1. Hevea benthamiana Müll.Arg. – Venezuela, SE Colombia, N Brazil
2. Hevea brasiliensis (Willd. ex A.Juss.) Müll.Arg. – Pará rubber tree – Brazil, French Guiana, Venezuela, Colombia, Peru, Bolivia; naturalized in parts of Asia and Africa and on some tropical islands
3. Hevea camargoana Pires – Marajó, Pará State in Brazil
4. Hevea camporum Ducke – Amazonas State in Brazil
5. Hevea guianensis Aubl. – Venezuela, Ecuador, Peru, Guyana, Suriname, French Guiana, Colombia, N Brazil
6. Hevea microphylla Ule – Venezuela, Colombia, N Brazil
7. Hevea nitida Mart. ex Müll.Arg. – Colombia, Amazonas State in Brazil
8. Hevea pauciflora (Spruce ex Benth.) Müll.Arg. – Venezuela, Peru, Guyana, Suriname, French Guiana, Colombia, N Brazil
9. Hevea rigidifolia (Spruce ex Benth.) Müll.Arg. – Vaupés region of Colombia, Amazonas State in Brazil
10. Hevea spruceana (Benth.) Müll.Arg. – Guyana, Amazonas State in Brazil
