= G. robusta =

G. robusta may refer to:

- Gila robusta, the roundtail chub, a cyprinid fish species found in the Colorado River drainage including the Gila River and the Rio Yaqui in western North America
- Gracula robusta, the Nias myna or Nias Hill myna, a bird species endemic resident of Nias and other nearby islands off western Sumatra
- Graffenrieda robusta, a plant species endemic to Peru
- Grevillea robusta, the southern silky oak, silky-oak or Australian Silver-oak, a tree species native of eastern coastal Australia

== See also ==
- Robusta
