= Carlos Castaño-Uribe =

Colombian anthropologist, archaeologist and environmentalist

Carlos Castaño-Uribe (born October 15, 1956, in Bogotá, Colombia) is a Colombian anthropologist, archaeologist, and environmentalist. He is recognized for his role in the declaration of many of Colombia's national parks and for initiating research, protection, and promotion of Chiribiquete National Park, the largest protected area in Colombia. He currently serves as the Scientific Director of Fundación Herencia Ambiental Caribe, which he co-leads with his wife Cristal Ange.

== Early life and education ==
Carlos Castaño-Uribe was born and raised in Bogotá. He studied anthropology at Universidad de los Andes, graduating in 1981 with a focus in archaeology. During his undergraduate years, he played a pivotal role in early archaeological research and restoration of Ciudad Perdida (also known as Teyuna) in the Sierra Nevada de Santa Marta. He later underwent doctoral studies in American Anthropology at the Universidad Complutense de Madrid.

== Career ==
=== As a conservationist ===
In 1985, Castaño-Uribe began his career in the National Natural Parks System of Colombia and later became its General Director. In 1989, he led the declaration of over 10 million hectares of protected Amazonian land, including multiple national parks. He introduced new conservation categories and promoted international cooperation through the Amazon Cooperation Treaty (TCA) and the SURAPA project. Carlos incorporated environmental and social standards in highway operations at the Instituto Nacional de Vías de Colombia (Invias). As general director of IDEAM, he implemented the National System for Environmental Information of Colombia and was responsible for Colombia ́s First Communication to the UN Climate Change Convention. From 2002 to 2009, he worked as an independent environmental consultant with organizations such as Conservation International, World Bank and FAO. Since 2009, Carlos is the Scientific Director of Fundacion Herencia Ambiental Caribe, where he leads projects to protect the natural and cultural heritage of Colombia, with emphasis on socio-ecological corridors, the recovery of ancestral knowledge and jaguar conservation. He left the post from 2010 to 2011 to work as Vice Minister of Environment, from which led the environmental aspects of the 2010-2014 National Development Plan and designed the current Ministry of Environment and Sustainable Development.

=== Public sector ===
Castaño-Uribe has held high-level environmental positions in Colombia, including:

- Director of the National Natural Parks System (1986–1998)
- General Director of the Institute of Hydrology, Meteorology and Environmental Studies, IDEAM (2001–2002)
- Vice Minister of Environment (2010–2011)

=== Chiribiquete National Park ===
In the late 1980s, Castaño-Uribe introduced the Chiribiquete range to mainstream Colombian society and led its declaration as a national park in 1989, protecting 1.2 million hectares. He played a key role in its expansions (2013 and 2018), now totaling over 4.2 million hectares, as well as in the coordination of the dossier to declare Chiribiquete a Cultural and Natural World Heritage Site at UNESCO (2018). He directed ten scientific expeditions, documenting over 76 rock shelters and more than 70,000 pictographs, some over 22,000 years old. He authored Parque Nacional Natural Serranía de Chiribiquete: la Maloka Cósmica de los Hombres Jaguar and has been a vocal advocate for environmental and cultural protection in the region.

== Personal life ==
Castaño-Uribe lives in Santa Marta with his wife Cristal Ange and their two children, Ilan and Chloe. He also has two children from a previous marriage: Juan Diego and María José Castaño Dávila.

== Academic work and publications ==
Castaño-Uribe has taught at FLACSO, Universidad de los Andes, and Universidad Nacional. His key publications include:

- Parque Nacional Natural Chiribiquete: La peregrinación de los jaguares (1998)
- Río Grande de la Magdalena (2003)
- Conflictos entre felinos y humanos en América Latina (2016)
- Parque Nacional Natural Serranía de Chiribiquete: La Maloka Cósmica de los Hombres Jaguar (2019)

== Public and media recognition ==
Castaño-Uribe's work has been featured widely in national and international media:

- TEDx Bogotá talk “Discovering the Center of the World” (2016)
- Revista 5 Sentidos – “El antropólogo que descubrió un tesoro en la Amazonía: Chiribiquete” (2020)
- El Tiempo – “Chiribiquete ya no aguanta más silencio” (2019)
- El Espectador – “En Chiribiquete se generó un modelo filosófico” (2019)
- El Colombiano – “Si no hacemos nada, en dos años no habrá Chiribiquete” (2019)
- El País – “El guardián de Chiribiquete cambia de estrategia” (2019)
- Las Dos Orillas – Hay Festival talk with daughter María José (2019)
- Caracol TV – “Chiribiquete: patrimonio mixto de la humanidad” (2020)
- National Geographic – “Amazonian Rock Art” (2023)
- WWF – “El hombre que nos contó sobre Chiribiquete”
- Featured in documentaries: “Chiribiquete: Videography of Expedition to the Center of the World”
- “Chiribiquete: A Journey to the Ancestral Memory of America”
- Cinemateca - El Tiempo – “El Cine y Yo”
- COMFAMA Masterclass – “Awaken your Jaguar Spirit”
- Podcast – “El Poder del Jaguar”

He has been featured widely in national and international media:

- Semana Magazine
- El Tiempo
- El Espectador
- Publimetro
- National Geographic
- Ministry of Science: Host of the “Diálogos de Saberes” YouTube series, including the Chiribiquete episode

Featured in two major documentaries:

- Chiribiquete, videografía de expedición al centro del mundo
- Chiribiquete: un viaje a la memoria ancestral de América

== Awards and distinctions ==
- Drago de Oro Medal, Government of Spain (1989)
- Fred M. Packard International Parks Merit Award, IUCN (1992)
- Named among “Best of Colombia” (1996)
- Best National Public Official (1997)
- Frailejón Dorado Award (2002)
- Diploma of Excellence, Universidad de los Andes (2003)
- Lifetime Achievement Award, SIRAP Caribe (2019)
- Río Sinú Medal, Córdoba Department (2019)
- National Order of Merit, Officer Grade (Colombian Presidency)
