= Hevea pauciflora =

Scientific classification
- Kingdom: Plantae
- Clade: Tracheophytes
- Clade: Angiosperms
- Clade: Eudicots
- Clade: Rosids
- Order: Malpighiales
- Family: Euphorbiaceae
- Genus: Hevea
- Species: H. pauciflora

Binomial name
- Hevea pauciflora (Spruce ex Benth.) Müll.Arg.

Species of tree

Hevea pauciflora is a species of rubber tree in the genus Hevea, belonging to the family Euphorbiaceae. It is native to the rainforests of Venezuela, the Guyanas, northern Brazil, Colombia and Peru. It grows on slopes and high river banks where it is not seasonally inundated.

H. pauciflora is a small evergreen tree growing to a height of about 18 m (60 ft). The specific epithet pauciflora is Latin for 'few-flowered'. It is sometimes tapped for rubber production but the latex is low in quality, being mixed with much resin. This tree has been used in breeding programmes, for example in Malaysia, to increase the disease resistance and improve the growth qualities of Hevea brasiliensis.
