= Graffenrieda caudata =

Conservation status
- Vulnerable (IUCN 2.3)

Scientific classification
- Kingdom: Plantae
- Clade: Tracheophytes
- Clade: Angiosperms
- Clade: Eudicots
- Clade: Rosids
- Order: Myrtales
- Family: Melastomataceae
- Genus: Graffenrieda
- Species: G. caudata

Binomial name
- Graffenrieda caudata Wurdack

Species of flowering plant

Graffenrieda caudata is a species of plant in the family Melastomataceae. It is endemic to Guyana.
