= Hevea camporum =

Conservation status
- Least Concern (IUCN 3.1)

Scientific classification
- Kingdom: Plantae
- Clade: Tracheophytes
- Clade: Angiosperms
- Clade: Eudicots
- Clade: Rosids
- Order: Malpighiales
- Family: Euphorbiaceae
- Genus: Hevea
- Species: H. camporum

Binomial name
- Hevea camporum Ducke

Species of tree

Hevea camporum is a species of flowering plant in the genus Hevea, the rubber trees, belonging to the family Euphorbiaceae. It is native to the Amazon basin where it occurs in Amazonas State in northwestern Brazil. Its habitat is dry savannah. In form it is a shrub, rarely taller than 2 m (7 ft) in the wild, though it can grow taller in cultivation.
