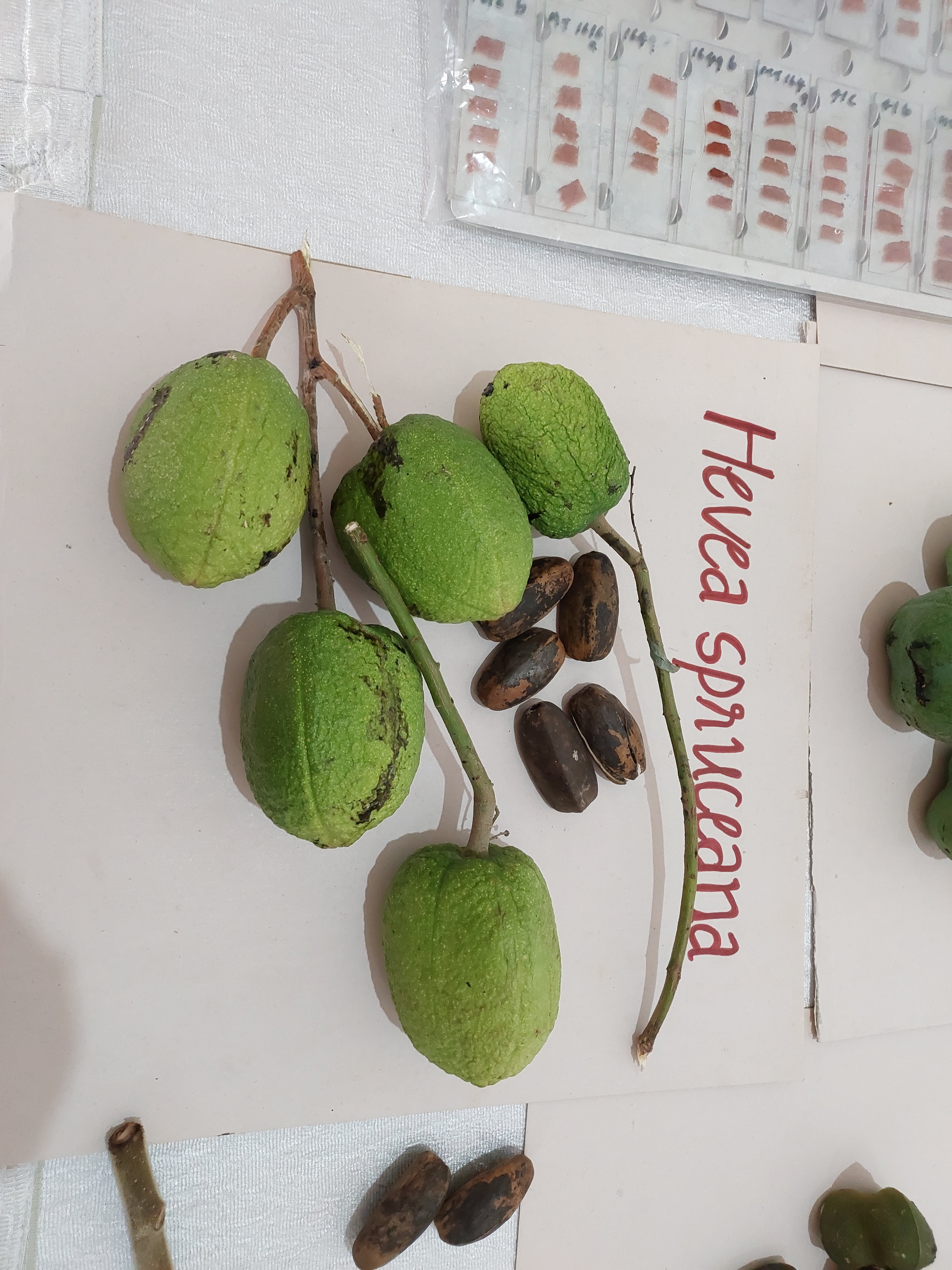
- Seeds of Hevea spruceana

Scientific classification
- Kingdom: Plantae
- Clade: Embryophytes
- Clade: Tracheophytes
- Clade: Spermatophytes
- Clade: Angiosperms
- Clade: Eudicots
- Clade: Rosids
- Order: Malpighiales
- Family: Euphorbiaceae
- Genus: Hevea
- Species: H. spruceana

Binomial name
- Hevea spruceana (Spruce ex Benth.) Müll.Arg.

= Hevea spruceana =

Species of tree

Hevea spruceana is a species of rubber tree in the genus Hevea, belonging to the family Euphorbiaceae. It is native to the rainforests of northern Brazil and Guyana. It is named in honour of the English botanist Richard Spruce who spent the years 1849 to 1864 exploring the Amazon basin and sending botanical specimens back to Europe.

== Description ==
H. spruceana is a medium-sized, evergreen tree that sometimes develops a markedly swollen trunk, seemingly a response to periodical flooding. The leaves have three elliptical leaflets. The inflorescence is a panicle with separate male and female flowers; in contrast to other members of the genus, the flowers of H. spruceana are purplish in colour. The usually three seeds are contained in a capsule with woody valves, but this does not break open explosively to expel the seeds as happens with other members of the genus.

== Distribution and habitat ==
H. spruceana is found in the Amazon basin, in a strip bordering the Amazon River and some of its tributaries. Its range extends for the length of the Amazon from its confluence with the Putumayo River as far as the Amazon delta, almost extending to the sea. This tree also grows beside the lower reaches of the Madeira River, the Rio Negro and other main Amazon tributaries. Its typical habitat is muddy islands and riverbanks in localities subject to frequent heavy flooding.

== Ecology ==
When the forest is flooded, the fruits of H. spruceana ripen and fall into the water. They act as a magnet to tambaquis, large seed-eating fish in the piranha family, which cluster around the trees, consuming every fruit that drops. The seeds are crushed by their powerful jaws but inevitably, some seeds pass through the fish undamaged and are dispersed elsewhere. Two other members of the piranha family that also feed on the fruits are Serrasalmus serrulatus and Pristobrycon striolatus. These fish are more selective, peeling the seeds and discarding the skins before breaking up and swallowing the kernels. Other fish that invade the flooded forest and are found near H. spruceana are the flesh-eating piranhas, which feed on other fish, insects, birds and animals that have fallen into the water, sometimes supplementing this diet with the fruits and seeds of the rubber tree.
