= Graffenrieda bella =

Conservation status
- Near Threatened (IUCN 2.3)

Scientific classification
- Kingdom: Plantae
- Clade: Tracheophytes
- Clade: Angiosperms
- Clade: Eudicots
- Clade: Rosids
- Order: Myrtales
- Family: Melastomataceae
- Genus: Graffenrieda
- Species: G. bella

Binomial name
- Graffenrieda bella Almeda

Species of flowering plant

Graffenrieda bella is a species of plant in the family Melastomataceae. It is endemic to Panama. It is threatened by habitat loss.
