= Hevea rigidifolia =

Scientific classification
- Kingdom: Plantae
- Clade: Tracheophytes
- Clade: Angiosperms
- Clade: Eudicots
- Clade: Rosids
- Order: Malpighiales
- Family: Euphorbiaceae
- Genus: Hevea
- Species: H. rigidifolia

Binomial name
- Hevea rigidifolia (Spruce ex Benth.) Müll.Arg.

Species of tree

Hevea rigidifolia is a species of rubber tree in the genus Hevea, belonging to the family Euphorbiaceae. It is native to the rainforests of northern Brazil and Colombia, where it is endemic to localities near the upper Rio Negro, a north bank tributary of the Amazon River, and its tributary, the Vaupés River.

== Description ==
H. rigidifolia is a small tree reaching about 18 m (60 ft) in height. Annual growth is in the form of vigorous spur shoots with short internodes, scale-like leaves on the lower portions and normal foliage on the upper portions. The leaves, which are bent back when they first emerge, are trifoliate and markedly different to those of other members of the genus, being smooth and glossy, thick, stiff and leathery in texture, with inrolled margins on the underside. The tree is evergreen, because the shoots and leaves grow before the old foliage is shed. The inflorescence is borne in the axil of a scale leaf. Separate male and female flowers are present, the flowers being large, with markedly twisted calyx lobes. The fruits are green with reddish tips and contain three large hexagonal seeds, measuring 27 by 20 mm (1.1 by 0.8 in). This tree is not used commercially for the production of latex having a poor reputation due to the high proportion of resins present.

== Distribution and habitat ==
H. rigidifolia is endemic to the upper reaches of the Rio Negro and the Vaupés River in the northern part of the Amazon basin, near the boundary between Brazil, Colombia and Venezuela. The typical habitat of H. rigidifolia is well-drained and relatively dry soils on rocky slopes. This is in the Caatinga region of dry forest which has an annual precipitation of 250 to 1,000 mm (10 to 39 in) but a prolonged dry season of six or more months.
