= Graffenrieda grandifolia =

Conservation status
- Near Threatened (IUCN 3.1)

Scientific classification
- Kingdom: Plantae
- Clade: Tracheophytes
- Clade: Angiosperms
- Clade: Eudicots
- Clade: Rosids
- Order: Myrtales
- Family: Melastomataceae
- Genus: Graffenrieda
- Species: G. grandifolia

Binomial name
- Graffenrieda grandifolia Gleason

Species of flowering plant

Graffenrieda grandifolia is a species of plant in the family Melastomataceae. It is endemic to Colombia.
