= Hevea camargoana =

Scientific classification
- Kingdom: Plantae
- Clade: Tracheophytes
- Clade: Angiosperms
- Clade: Eudicots
- Clade: Rosids
- Order: Malpighiales
- Family: Euphorbiaceae
- Genus: Hevea
- Species: H. camargoana

Binomial name
- Hevea camargoana Pires

Species of tree

Hevea camargoana is a species of flowering plant in the genus Hevea, the rubber trees, belonging to the family Euphorbiaceae. It is native to the island of Marajó in the Amazon delta in northeastern Brazil where it was discovered in 1975. It is a small tree and Its typical habitat is dry savannah and woodland bordering seasonally inundated swamps.

In the wild, this species grows to a height of 2 to 12 m (7 to 39 ft), but in cultivation it can reach twice this height. Distinguishing features include leaves with pale green undersides, whitish flowers with red bases, toothed basal disks, and single whorls of three to five stamens in the male flowers. The fruits contain three large, rounded seeds.
