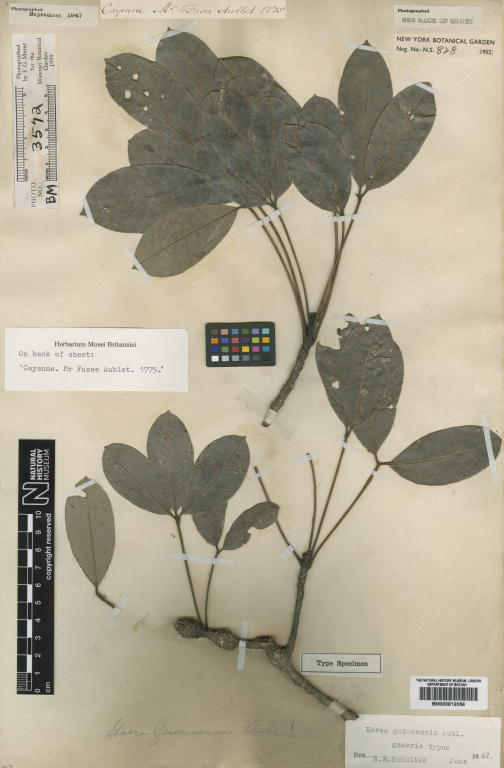
- Specimen at the British Museum

Scientific classification
- Kingdom: Plantae
- Clade: Tracheophytes
- Clade: Angiosperms
- Clade: Eudicots
- Clade: Rosids
- Order: Malpighiales
- Family: Euphorbiaceae
- Genus: Hevea
- Species: H. guianensis

Binomial name
- Hevea guianensis Aubl.

= Hevea guianensis =

Species of tree

Hevea guianensis is a species of rubber tree in the genus Hevea, belonging to the family Euphorbiaceae. It is native to the rainforests of Ecuador, Venezuela, the Guyanas, Brazil, Colombia and Peru. It generally grows on well-drained soils or on those that are only lightly inundated, on river banks, in gallery forests, savannah forests and wooded slopes.

== Description ==
H. guianensis is a large evergreen tree growing to a height of 30 m (100 ft). Annual growth is in the form of vigorous short shoots on which flowers and foliage develop before the old leaves are shed. The leaves are tri-foliate (with three leaflets), the leaflets being folded back when the leaf emerges but becoming semi-erect as the leaf matures, the only species in the genus where this is the case. The variety lutea differs from the nominate race in having obovate leaflets instead of elliptical ones. The inflorescence is borne on the tip of the short shoots, there being separate male and female flowers. Each flower has five perianth lobes, the male flowers having five anthers, arranged in a single whorl in a central column, but in lutea they may be arranged in an irregular whorl or in two whorls. The female flowers have a central pistil with a disk below. The fruit is a three-chambered capsule which splits apart explosively to expel the seeds; these are kite-shaped and measure 21 by 18 mm (0.8 by 0.7 in).

== Uses ==
H. guianensis is tapped for latex in the wild but is not cultivated for this purpose. It produces a yellowish latex of inferior quality to Hevea brasiliensis. The seeds are poisonous when raw but are eaten by native people when cooked.
