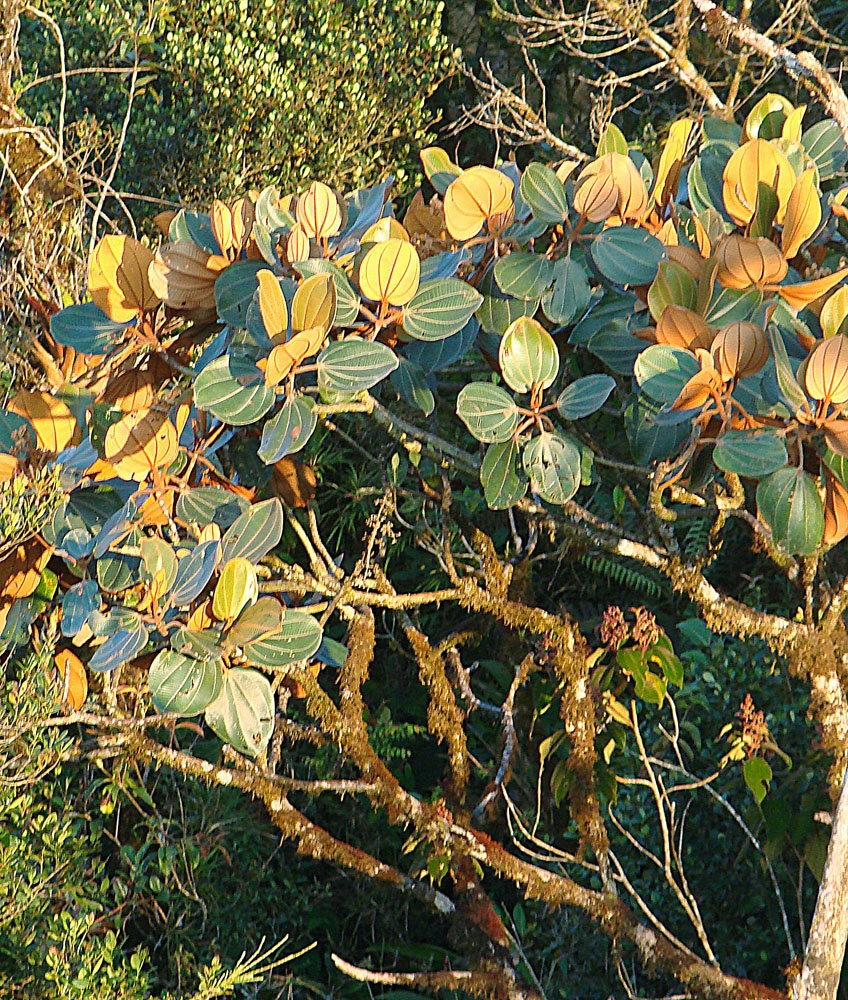
- Graffenrieda emarginata

Scientific classification
- Kingdom: Plantae
- Clade: Embryophytes
- Clade: Tracheophytes
- Clade: Angiosperms
- Clade: Eudicots
- Clade: Rosids
- Order: Myrtales
- Family: Melastomataceae
- Genus: Graffenrieda; DC.

Species
- See text

= Graffenrieda =

Genus of flowering plants

Graffenrieda is a genus of flowering plants in the family Melastomataceae. There are about 44 species. Most occur in South America. A few are distributed in Mexico, Central America and the Caribbean.

Species include:

- Graffenrieda bella
- Graffenrieda caudata
- Graffenrieda glandulosa
- Graffenrieda grandifolia
- Graffenrieda harlingii
- Graffenrieda jefensis
- Graffenrieda maklenkensis
- Graffenrieda penneysii
- Graffenrieda phoenica
- Graffenrieda robusta
- Graffenrieda trichanthera
