= Graffenrieda robusta =

Conservation status
- Data Deficient (IUCN 2.3)

Scientific classification
- Kingdom: Plantae
- Clade: Tracheophytes
- Clade: Angiosperms
- Clade: Eudicots
- Clade: Rosids
- Order: Myrtales
- Family: Melastomataceae
- Genus: Graffenrieda
- Species: G. robusta

Binomial name
- Graffenrieda robusta (Cogn.) L.O.Williams

Synonyms
- Calyptrella robusta Cogn.

Species of plant

Graffenrieda robusta is a species of plant in the family Melastomataceae. It is endemic to Peru and grows primarily in the wet tropical biome.
