= Hevea nitida =

Scientific classification
- Kingdom: Plantae
- Clade: Tracheophytes
- Clade: Angiosperms
- Clade: Eudicots
- Clade: Rosids
- Order: Malpighiales
- Family: Euphorbiaceae
- Genus: Hevea
- Species: H. nitida

Binomial name
- Hevea nitida Mart. ex Müll.Arg.

Species of tree

Hevea nitida is a species of rubber tree in the genus Hevea, belonging to the family Euphorbiaceae. It is a medium-sized evergreen tree up to 27 m (90 ft) tall. It is native to the rainforests of northern Brazil and Colombia.

== Description ==
H. nitida is a medium-sized, evergreen tree growing to 27 m (90 ft) with a slender trunk and branching crown. The exception to this is the variety toxicodendroides, which is a shrubby form only growing to about 2 m (7 ft) tall. The leaves have three, drooping, elliptical leaflets, that are folded upwards at the midrib; both upper and lower surfaces are glossy bright green. Male and female flowers are separate and borne in mixed panicles. The calyx lobes have blunt tips and the disks of both male and female flowers are markedly broad, and in the female flowers, lacerated. The fruit capsules are green with reddish tips and usually contain three large, rounded seeds.

== Distribution and habitat ==
H. nitida is found in northern Brazil and Colombia.It mostly occurs north of the Amazon River, and because of its habitat requirements for drier ground, its range is divided into a number of subpopulations mainly in the western half of the range of the genus. There are also populations south of the Amazon in northern Peru and near the lower reaches of the Madeira River. It grows at altitudes of up to about 1,000 m (3,300 ft) above sea level, typically growing in sandy soil, in sparse, well-drained forest, but sometimes growing in areas briefly inundated in the wet season. The variety H. nitida var toxicodendroides only grows on the sandstone mesas of the Vaupés Department and Amazonas Department in Colombia.

== Uses ==
The seeds are poisonous when raw but can be eaten when well-boiled. Some native tribes consume them regularly, but others regard them as famine food only to be eaten at times of food scarcity. Tapping the tree gives a thin latex that has the undesirable quality of preventing coagulation when mixed with the latex from other rubber tree species.
