= Rubberwood =

Type of wood

Rubberwood is a light-colored medium-density tropical hardwood obtained from the Pará rubber tree (Hevea brasiliensis), usually from trees grown in rubber plantations. Rubberwood is commonly advertised as an "environmentally friendly" wood, as it makes use of plantation trees that have already served a useful function.

== Other names ==
Rubberwood is also known as plantation hardwood, or "Hevea" for the genus that the tree belongs to. In 2002, the Malaysian Ministry of Primary Industries marketed it under the name "Malaysian Oak".

== History ==
Although it had been used on a small scale before, its use for furniture making has become much more common in the late 20th and early 21st century with the development of chemical treatments to protect the wood against fungal and insect attacks. There are extensive rubber plantations with mature trees, especially in southeast Asia; the earlier practice was to burn the tree at the end of its latex-producing cycle.

Currently, rubber plantation trees are generally harvested for wood after they complete the latex producing cycle, when they are 25 to 30 years old. When the latex yields become extremely low, the trees are then felled, and new trees are usually planted. This makes rubberwood 'eco-friendly' in a way that the wood is harvested from a renewable source. The wood from the trees is light in color and straight-grained making it easy to stain and match in woodworking. Part of the industry adoption of rubberwood was an international campaign to avoid use of a previously used light straight-grained wood which was harvested from South East Asia's endangered wetland ramin (Gonystylus).

== Chemical treatment ==
Rubberwood is susceptible to fungal and insect attack that limited its use in the past. However, in the 1980s, the development of chemical treatment processes allowed the wood to be more widely used for furniture making and frames. Rubberwood is generally treated soon after sawing by pressurized immersion in boron preservative solution to diffuse the chemicals. Then, the treated timber is kiln-dried to reduce its moisture content.

== Uses ==
Rubberwood has a dense grain that is easily controlled in the kiln drying process. Rubberwood has very little shrinkage, making it one of the more stable construction materials available for furniture, toys, and kitchen accessories. It is easily worked, and takes on stains uniformly. As with all hardwoods, rubberwood comes in varying degrees of quality.

It is not suitable for outdoor use, as rain can leach the protective chemicals from the wood, exposing it to fungus and insect attacks. Excessive moisture will also cause the wood to warp and rot.
