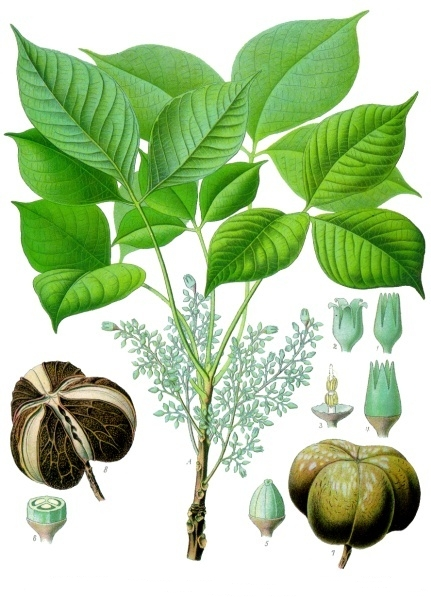

Conservation status
- Least Concern (IUCN 3.1)

Scientific classification
- Kingdom: Plantae
- Clade: Tracheophytes
- Clade: Angiosperms
- Clade: Eudicots
- Clade: Rosids
- Order: Malpighiales
- Family: Euphorbiaceae
- Genus: Hevea
- Species: H. brasiliensis

Binomial name
- Hevea brasiliensis Müll.Arg.
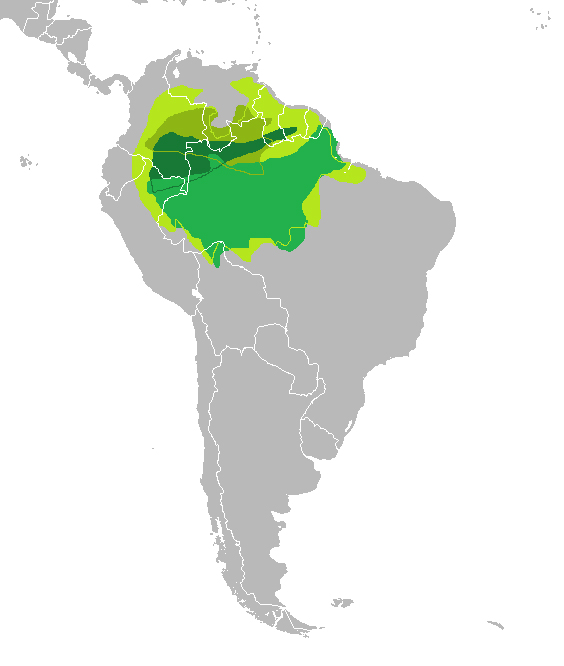
- Range of the genus Hevea.

= Hevea brasiliensis =

Rubber tree

Most common rubber tree

Hevea brasiliensis, the Pará rubber tree, sharinga tree, seringueira, or, most commonly, rubber tree or rubber plant, is a flowering plant belonging to the spurge family, Euphorbiaceae. It is originally native to the Amazon basin, but is now pantropical in distribution due to introductions. It is the most economically important member of the genus Hevea, because the milky latex extracted from the tree is the primary source of natural rubber.

== Description ==
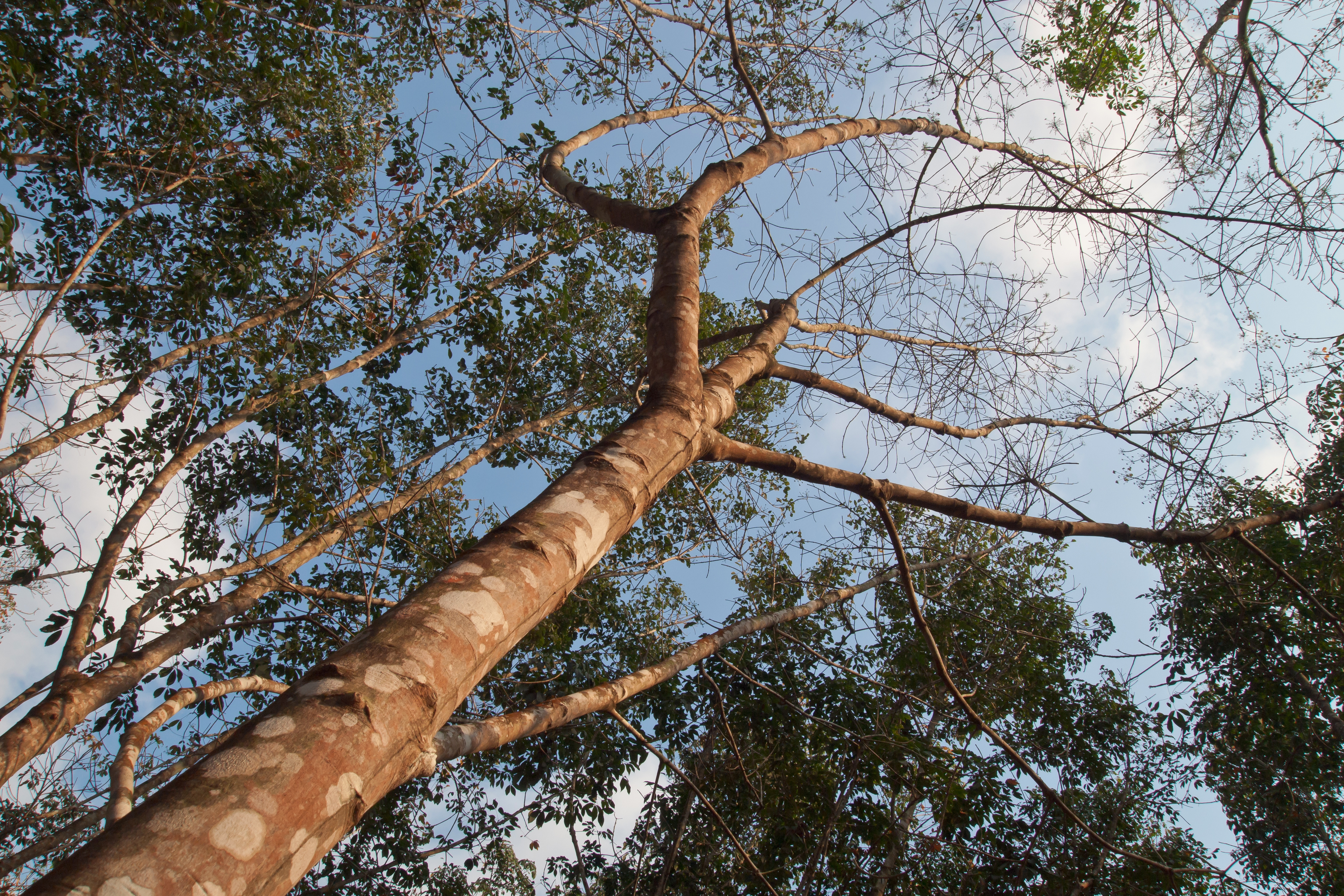
Canopy and trunk, Thailand

Hevea brasiliensis is a tall deciduous tree growing to a height of up to 43 m (141 ft) in the wild. Cultivated trees are usually much smaller because drawing off the latex restricts their growth. The trunk is cylindrical and may have a swollen, bottle-shaped base. The bark is some shade of brown, and the inner bark oozes latex when damaged. The leaves have three leaflets and are spirally arranged. The inflorescences include separate male and female flowers. The flowers are pungent, creamy-yellow and have no petals. The fruit is a capsule that contains three large seeds; it opens explosively when ripe.

== Rubber tree plantation ==
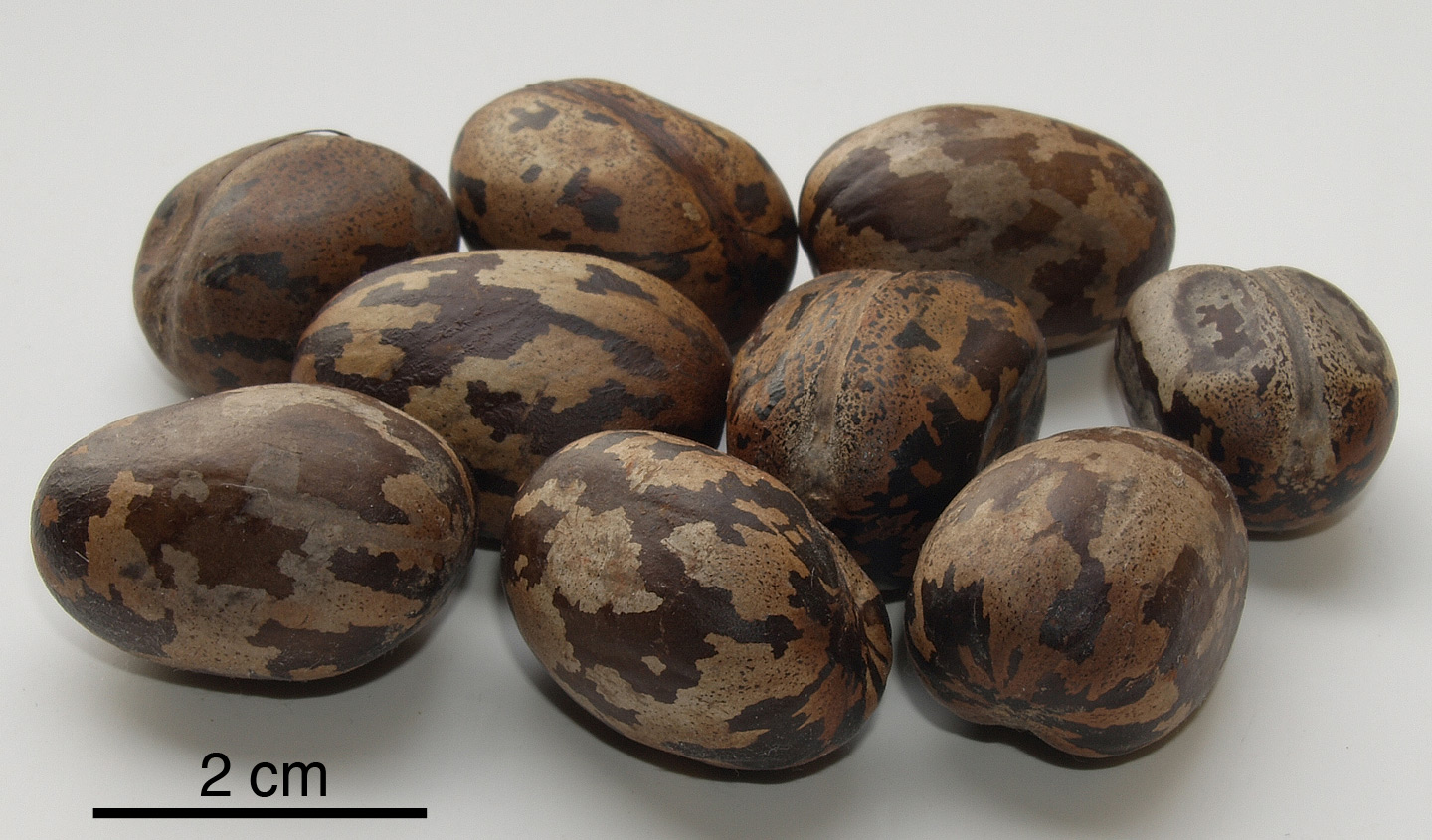
Seeds

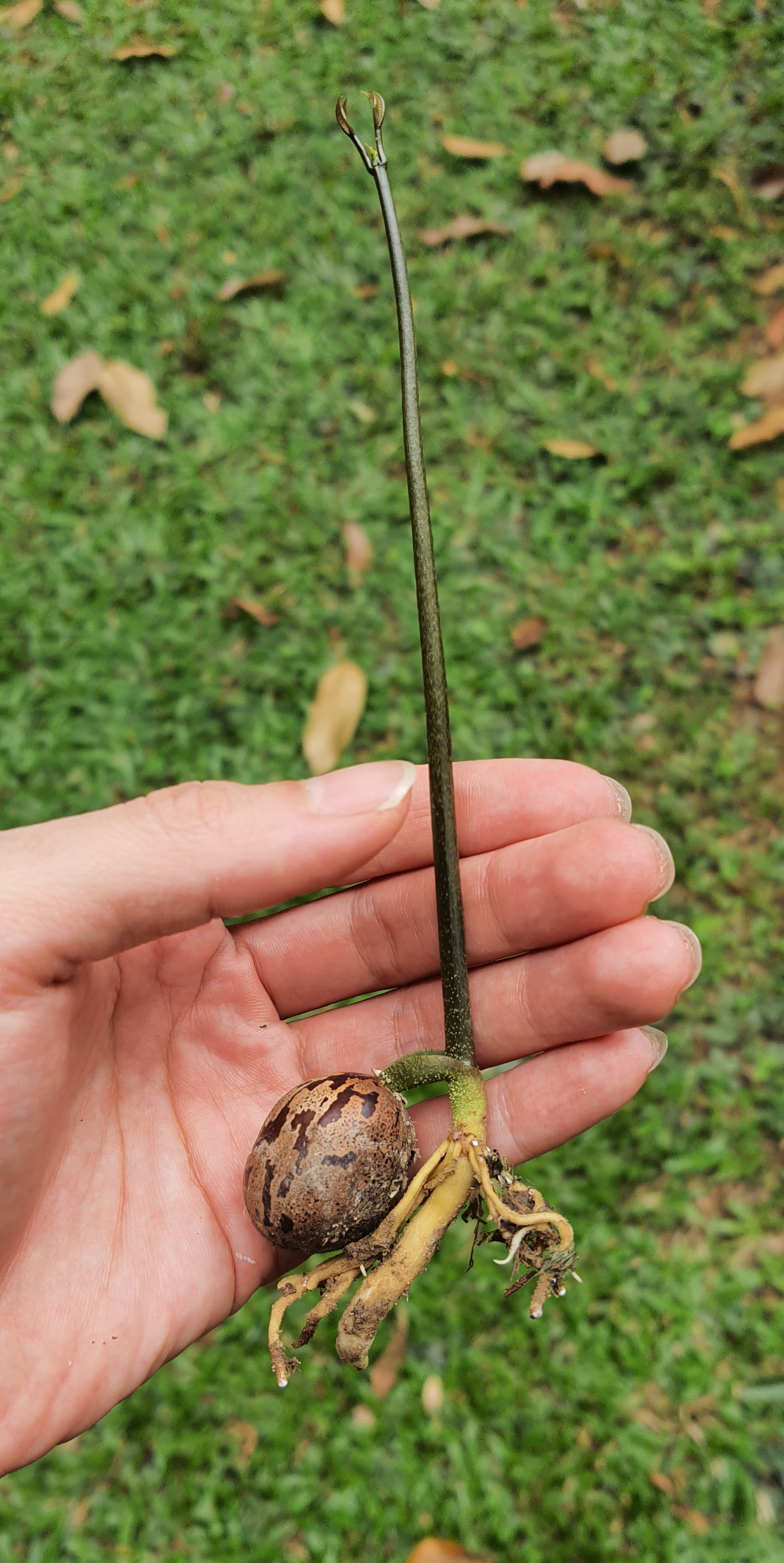
A sprouting seed in a house backyard in Malaysia

In the wild the tree can reach a height of up to 43 metres (141 ft). The white or yellow latex occurs in latex vessels in the bark, mostly outside the phloem. These vessels spiral up the tree in a right-handed helix which forms an angle of about 30 degrees with the horizontal, and can grow as high as 15 metres (49 ft).

In plantations the trees are generally smaller for two reasons: 1) trees grow more slowly when they are tapped for latex, and 2) trees are generally cut down after only 30 years, because latex production declines as trees age, and they are no longer economically productive. The tree requires a tropical or subtropical climate with a minimum of about 1,200 mm (50 in) per year of rainfall, and no frost. If frost does occur, the results can be disastrous for production. One frost can cause the rubber from an entire plantation to become brittle and break once it has been refined.

=== Latex tapping ===
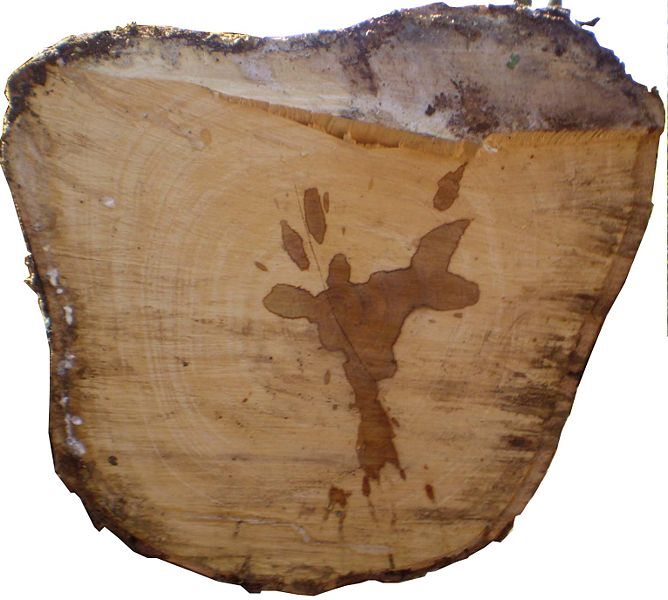
Trunk crosssection

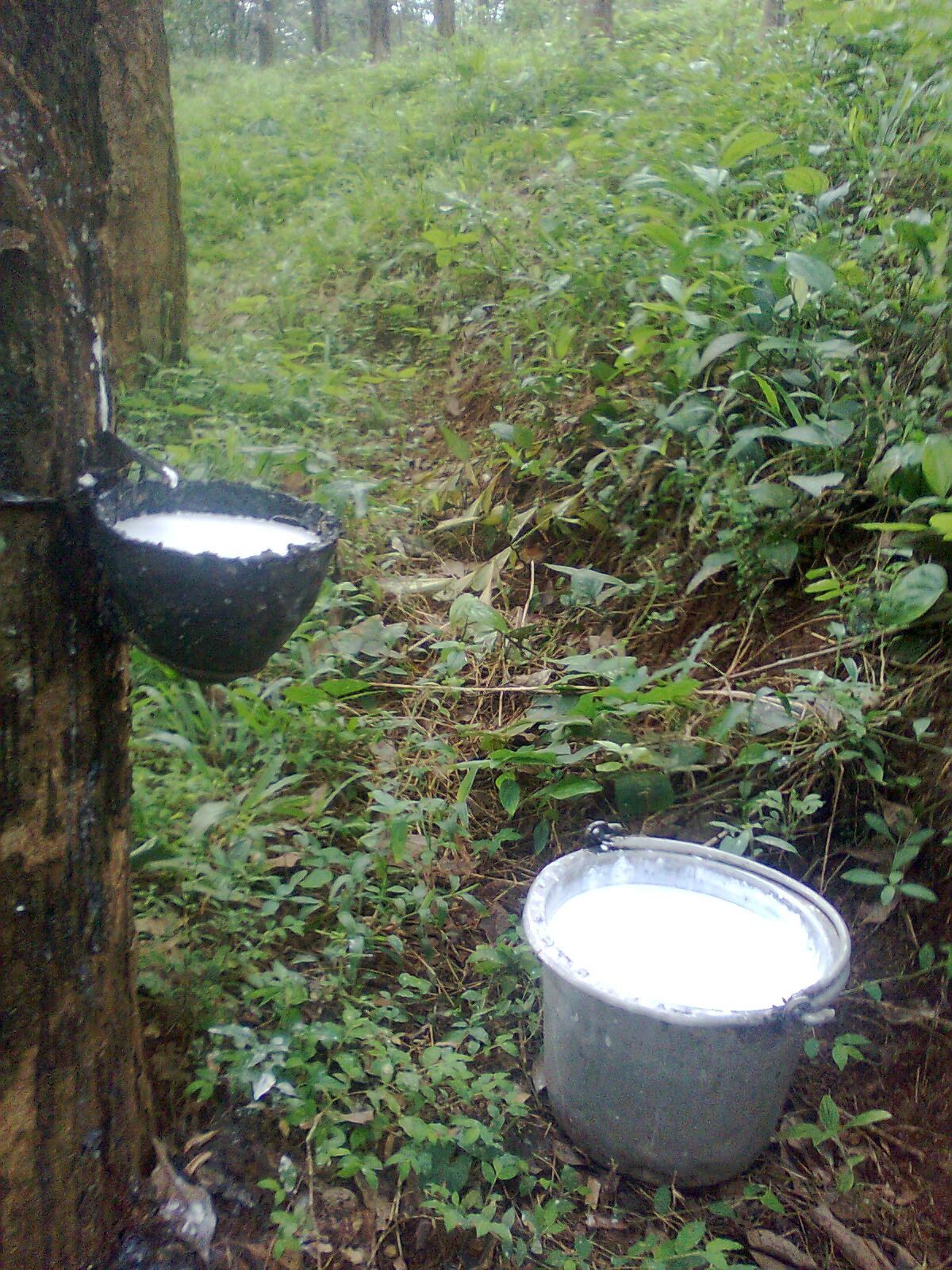
Latex being collected from an incised rubber tree and a bucket of collected latex

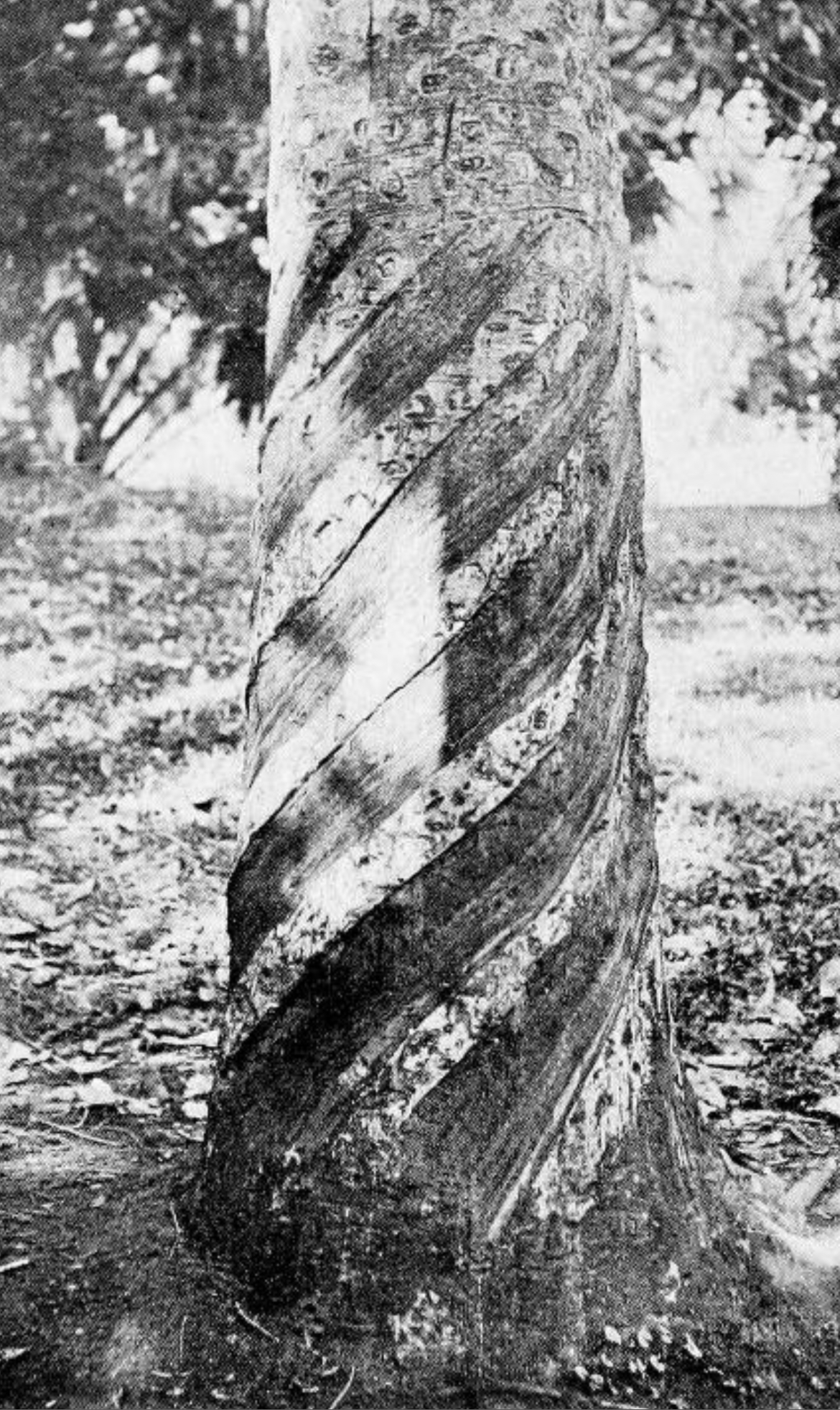
"Spiral tapping of Hevea brasiliensis." Photograph circa 1911, taken in Brazil.

The rubber tree takes between seven and ten years to deliver the first harvest. Harvesters make incisions across the latex vessels, just deep enough to tap the vessels without harming the tree's growth, and the latex is collected in small buckets. This process is known as rubber tapping. Latex production is highly variable from tree to tree and across clone types.

=== Wood harvesting ===
As latex production declines with age, rubber trees are generally felled when they reach the age of 25 to 30 years. The earlier practice was to burn the trees, but in recent decades, the wood has been harvested for furniture making.

== History ==
The South American rubber tree grew only in the Amazon rainforest, and increasing demand and the discovery of the vulcanization procedure in 1839 led to the rubber boom in that region, enriching the cities of Belém, Santarém, and Manaus in Brazil and Iquitos, Peru, from 1840 to 1913. In Brazil, before the name was changed to 'Seringueira' the initial name of the plant was 'pará rubber tree', derived from the name of the province of Grão-Pará. In Peru, the tree was called 'árbol del caucho', and the latex extracted from it was called 'caucho'. The tree was used to obtain rubber by the natives who inhabited its geographical distribution. The Olmec people of Mesoamerica extracted and produced similar forms of rubber from analogous latex-producing trees such as Castilla elastica as early as 3,600 years ago. The rubber was used, among other things, to make the balls used in the Mesoamerican ballgame. Early attempts were made in 1873 to grow H. brasiliensis outside Brazil. After some effort, 12 seedlings were germinated at the Royal Botanic Gardens, Kew. These were sent to India for cultivation, but died. A second attempt was then made, some 70,000 seeds being smuggled to Kew in 1875, by Henry Wickham, in the service of the British Empire. About four percent of these germinated, and in 1876, about 2,000 seedlings were sent, in Wardian cases, to Ceylon (modern day Sri Lanka) and 22 were sent to the botanic gardens in Singapore.

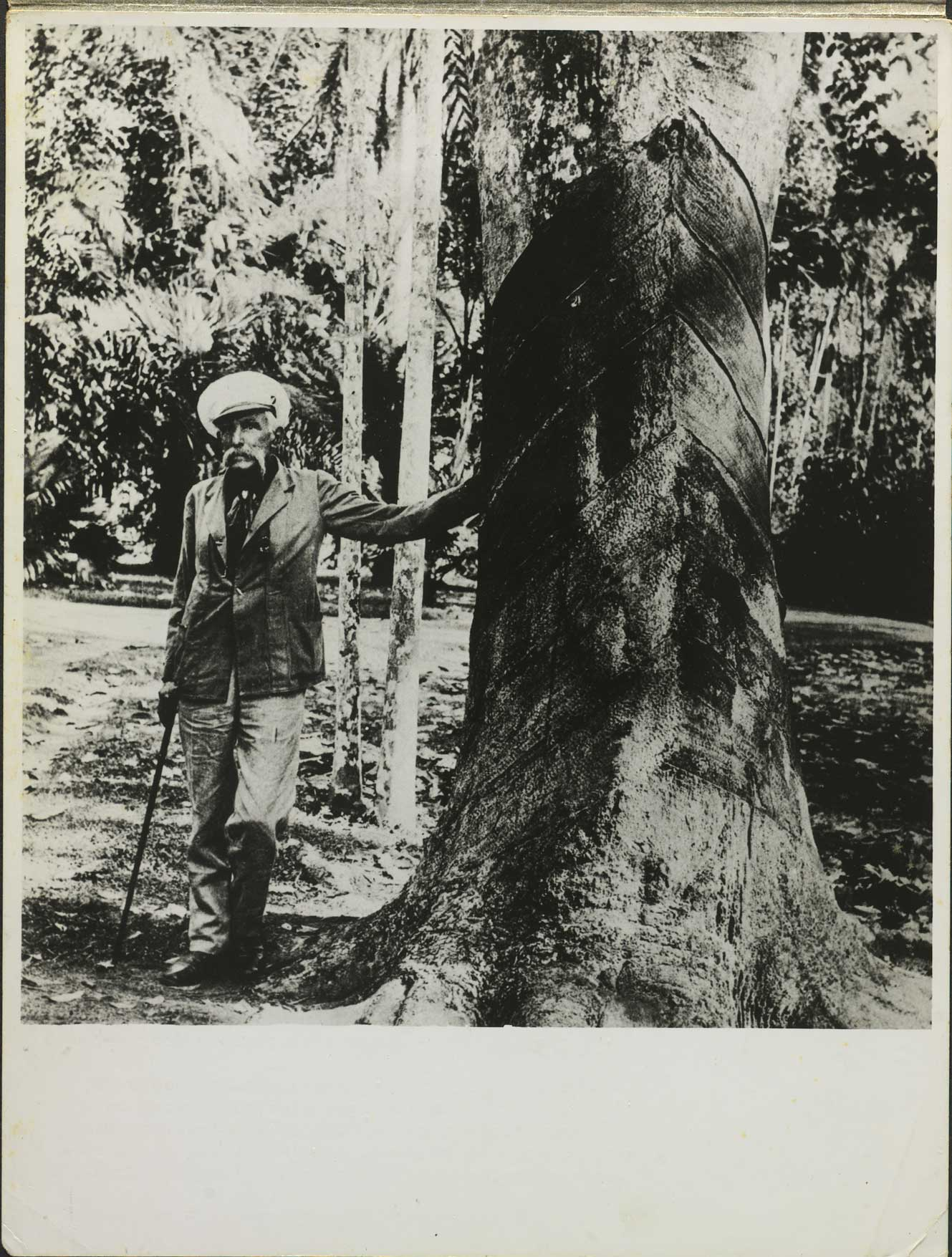
"Henry Wickham, who in 1876 directed an operation smuggling 70,000 rubber tree seeds"

Once established outside its native country, rubber was extensively propagated in the British colonies. Rubber trees were brought to the botanical gardens at Buitenzorg, Java, in 1883. By 1898, a rubber plantation had been established in Malaya, with imported Chinese field workers being the dominant work force in rubber production in the early 20th-century.

The cultivation of the tree in South America (Amazon) ended early in the 20th century because of indigenous blights that targeted the rubber tree. The blight, called South American leaf blight, is caused by the ascomycete Pseudocercospora ulei, also called Microcyclus ulei, or Dothidella ulei, which is endemic to the Amazon Basin. The blight was considered one of the five most aggressive diseases in commercial crops in South America. Rubber production then moved to parts of the world where it is not indigenous, and therefore not affected by local plant diseases. Today, most rubber tree plantations are in South and Southeast Asia, the top rubber producing countries in 2011 being Thailand, Indonesia, Malaysia, India and Vietnam.

== Environmental concerns ==
The toxicity of arsenic to insects, bacteria, and fungi has led to the heavy use of arsenic trioxide on rubber plantations, especially in Malaysia.

The majority of the rubber trees in Southeast Asia are clones of varieties highly susceptible to the South American leaf blight—Pseudocercospora ulei. For these reasons, environmental historian Charles C. Mann, in his 2011 book, 1493: Uncovering the New World Columbus Created, predicted that the Southeast Asian rubber plantations will be ravaged by the blight in the not-too-distant future, thus creating a potential calamity for international industry.

== Secondary metabolites ==
Hevea brasiliensis produces cyanogenic glycosides (CGs) as a defense, concentrated in the seeds. (Although effective against other attackers, cyanogenic glycosides are not very effective against fungal pathogens. In rare cases, they are even detrimental. This is the case for the rubber tree, which actually suffers worse from Pseudocercospora ulei when it produces more cyanogenic glycosides. This may be because cyanide inhibits the production of other defensive metabolites. This results in significantly divergent subpopulations with selection for or against cyanogenic glycosides, depending on local likelihoods of fungal or non-fungal pest pressure.) The carbon and nitrogen in CGs are recycled for growth and latex production if needed, and the ease of doing so makes them an attractive nitrogen store - especially if the plant is light-deprived and storage in photosynthesis proteins would thus be unhelpful. The α-hydroxynitriles are likely contained in the cytoplasm. Linamarin is hydrolyzed by an accompanying linamarase, a β-glycosidase. Hevea brasiliensis linamarase does act upon linamarin because it is a monoglucoside, while it does not for linustatin because it is a diglucoside - in fact, the production of lovastatin inhibits linamarase cleavage of linamarin. This allows intra-plant, post-synthesis transport of linustatin without risking premature cleavage.

== Other uses ==
In rural Malaysia, collected seeds are often made into toys like whirligigs, toy helicopters, and spinning tops.

=== Culinary ===
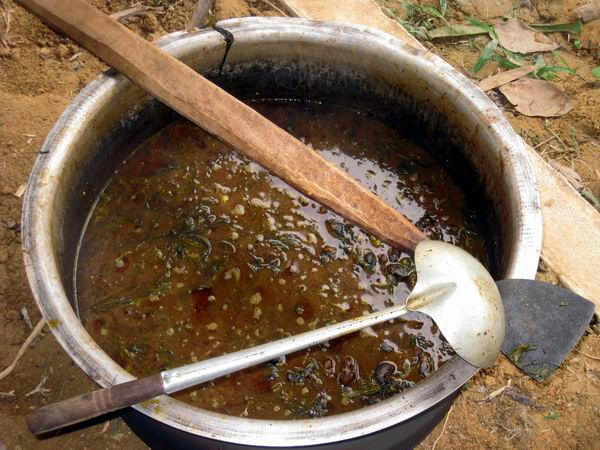
A cauldron of rubber seed gulai in a kampung in Jerantut, Pahang.

With the introduction of Hevea brasiliensis to British Malaya as a cash crop, local Malay communities living in rural plantations of Jerantut and Temerloh in Pahang began foraging rubber seeds as a source of food developing the dish of gulai asam rong (lit. 'sour [rubber] kernel gulai'): the collected seeds are sun-dried, cracked of their shells, redried, and then pounded into a coarse meal which is squeezed dry. This now dried seed meal is stewed with caught freshwater fish such as kenerak (Bagarius), patin (Pangasius), or even tilapia.

== See also ==
- Castilla elastica—the principal source of latex rubber among the pre-Columbian Mesoamerican peoples
- Landolphia owariensis—a liana that was the primary source of Congo rubber
- List of plants of Amazon Rainforest vegetation of Brazil
- Red Rubber Scandal—was one of the first humanitarian global campaigns but concerned the rubber vine species
- Fordlândia
- Rubber seed oil
- Rubberwood
- Singapore Botanic Gardens
- Taraxacum kok-saghyz
